= Paul Mooney: Analyzing White America =

- Written by: Paul Mooney
- Starring: Paul Mooney; Joe Inscoe; Bridget Gethis; Kate Fleckenstein
- Release date: 2002
- Country: United States
- Language: English

Paul Mooney: Analyzing White America is a 2002 stand-up comedy film starring comedian Paul Mooney, with Joe Inscoe, Bridget Gethis, and Kate Fleckenstein featured in sitcom-like cut scenes between Mooney's regular stand-up routine.

Among the topics covered are the September 11th terrorist attacks, the "N" word, interracial marriage, Jerry Springer, and white people being obsessed with wild animals to the point of being in danger or being killed. A 2006 reissue of the DVD features a bonus interview by producer/actor Tim Reid (WKRP in Cincinnati, Frank's Place).

Analyzing White America was Mooney's first DVD release, followed by Know Your History: Jesus Is Black; So Was Cleopatra in 2006.
