= Bailey Quarters =

Character on the television situation comedy WKRP in Cincinnati

- WKRP in Cincinnati character
- Bailey Quarters (Jan Smithers) and Andy Travis (Gary Sandy)
- Portrayed by: Jan Smithers

In-universe information
- Gender: Female
- Nationality: American

Bailey Quarters is a character on the television sitcom WKRP in Cincinnati. She was played by actress Jan Smithers, and was based on creator Hugh Wilson's wife.

== WKRP roles ==
Bailey originally came from Chicago with a degree in journalism from The Ohio State University, where she graduated summa cum laude. Her ambition is eventually to be a broadcasting executive, but though intelligent and talented, she was held back early on by her extreme shyness and fear of speaking up. In the earliest episodes, station manager Arthur Carlson could not even remember who she was or whether "Bailey" was a man or a woman.

She is originally in charge of just the billing and station traffic, but that changes when Andy Travis takes over as the program director of WKRP. One of his first acts is to give Bailey more duties, including being an on-air news reporter, over the strenuous objections of sales manager Herb Tarlek and news director Les Nessman, who feels threatened. In the episode "Dear Liar", a take-off on the Janet Cooke scandal, Bailey writes a news story that is partly fictional, which could have cost the station its broadcast license, though it was still in its initial draft and Bailey had not committed to using it. It only becomes an issue when Les jealously plagiarizes it on the air. Eventually the professional relationship between Les and Bailey becomes less strained, with Les allowing her more freedom and input on the station's news reporting. During the episode "In Concert", when reporting on the tragedy at the December 3, 1979 concert by The Who at Riverfront Coliseum (which Bailey had attended and Les hadn't), Les brings a depressed Bailey's spirits up by telling her "we're newsmen… well, newspersons" and telling her he needs her help to cover the story responsibly.

As the series goes on, Bailey becomes more assertive and more able to speak up for herself. She undergoes subtle changes in her hairstyle and appears in eyeglasses less and less. She becomes better at standing up to her nemesis Herb; in one episode, she throws lighted matches at Herb's polyester suit, threatening to set it on fire. By the second season, she has evolved into a serious and dependable career-minded woman who brings "a measure of sanity" to the station. By the fourth season, she has developed to be on an equal footing with her co-workers.

She becomes increasingly associated with environmentalism and other activist causes. One episode begins with her circulating a petition against nuclear power; in another episode, she mentions that she spent the weekend campaigning for the Equal Rights Amendment. In the episode "Circumstantial Evidence", while testifying in court, she starts complaining to the judge about the plight of baby seals and dolphins. Some of these character traits came from the actress who played Bailey, Jan Smithers, who was herself involved with animal-rights and clean-energy causes; as with many of the WKRP characters, elements of the actor were incorporated into the character, giving the character more depth as the show went on. Although Bailey did not appear in the sequel series, The New WKRP in Cincinnati, it is revealed that she later left broadcasting and became the mayor of Ann Arbor, Michigan (an ironic fate for an Ohio State grad, as Ann Arbor is the home of OSU's great rival, the University of Michigan).

Bailey's character was overshadowed by that of Jennifer Marlowe (played by Loni Anderson), the blonde bombshell of the station. The relationship between Jennifer and Bailey has often been likened to that between Ginger and Mary Ann from Gilligan's Island. Two generations of American males were judged by their answers to the question "Ginger or Mary Ann?" and "Jennifer or Bailey?", and both sets of women became cultural icons of their generations.

== Personal life ==
Bailey has an on-again, off-again romance with Dr. Johnny Fever. In the early episodes, it is suggested that Bailey looks up to Johnny as her mentor in the world of broadcasting, but that she also has a schoolgirl crush on him, which leads her to ask him out on a date in the second-season opener, "For Love or Money".

In the third season, Bailey and Fever are seen in the bullpen lounging on the couch together with Bailey's arm familiarly placed around Johnny's shoulders ("Out to Lunch"). By the fourth season, their relationship develops into what Smithers characterized as "more adult", giving both characters another dimension to develop. However, their relationship never seems to go further than the occasional date. (It is implied at the end of "For Love or Money" and "Mike Fright" that they have had at least casual sexual relations, though in both cases, it could be discounted as hyperbole.) In season four's "Rumors", when Johnny stays at Bailey's place for a few days, Bailey is infuriated by the gossip that they are sleeping together, disappointing Johnny, who was hoping that the rumors would come true.

While her friend Jennifer dates mostly wealthy older men, Bailey seems to have a different taste in men, dating not only Johnny but also (in the episode "In Concert") a manic-depressive divinity student with a serious drinking problem. In the episode "The Americanization of Ivan", Bailey is the focus of a Soviet defector's attentions; although he wishes her help in defecting to the U.S., the Russian is also smitten with her good looks. In the episode "Jennifer Falls in Love", Bailey enters a nearly daydream-like state when merely listening to Jennifer's description of her new blond repairman boyfriend named Steel, and is almost incapable of coherent conversation when she finally meets him.

Her occasional references to her family suggest that she does not get along well with her parents, which may explain why she left Chicago. In one episode, she mentions that a visit home consists of relatives asking her if she's "Involved? Engaged? Pregnant?" In another episode, she attempts to describe her relationship with her father, but is left speechless with anger. In a third episode, Mr. Carlson mentions that "I talked to Bailey's father and he said I could shoot her."

Bailey's best friend at the station is Jennifer, with whom she often discusses relationship matters (such as obliquely referring to her crush on Johnny, or giving Jennifer advice on how to deal with Herb). She also has a strong friendship with Venus Flytrap.

== Casting and inspiration ==
Jan Smithers was one of the few WKRP cast members who was the first choice for the role she played. Creator Hugh Wilson said that despite Smithers' lack of experience (she had never done a situation comedy before), she was perfect for the character of Bailey as he had conceived her: "Other actresses read better for the part," Wilson recalled, "but they were playing shy. Jan was shy."

Wilson had based the character on Charters Smith, whom Wilson would eventually marry in 1979.

== Cultural references and gender roles ==
Bailey Quarters is cited as an example of how 1970s' sitcoms reflected changing views of gender and women's roles in society and the workplace. One aspect of this is the expectation that women would be treated equally as men. The character of Bailey joined WKRP with a journalism degree and advanced from creating promotions to writing news copy to news broadcasting. This progression confirmed that hard work and talent would be rewarded, reinforced values of equality and diversity, and provided female viewers with reassurance of seeing a friendly, supportive workplace, and a character that struggled to be assertive and to overcome shyness, succeeding in gaining the respect of her coworkers. Even insecure, shy and chauvinistic newsman Les learns to accept assistance in his job from a woman as he learns to respect Bailey's ability and also respect Bailey as a person.

Bailey Quarters is contrasted not only with the other principal female character, receptionist Jennifer Marlowe, but also with the male characters. In contrast to Jennifer, Bailey seeks recognition in a "man's" field of journalism for her work in that field. Jennifer and Bailey offer, in a blonde-brunette dyad typical of sitcoms of the era, contrasting portrayals of female sexuality from opposite ends of the spectrum.

Bailey Quarters (Jan Smithers)

Male viewers often felt Bailey Quarters was more realistic and approachable than the idealized Jennifer Marlowe. The character showed that a woman could be both smart and attractive, similar to the actress Jan Smithers, who was a professional model before the show.

By comparing Jennifer’s traditional style with Bailey’s modern views, WKRP in Cincinnati explored changing gender roles. Bailey became a popular symbol of 1970s feminism because many women found her down-to-earth personality easy to relate to.

Bailey Quarters was one of the first media examples of the popular naming convention of use of a surname as a female first name. For men it was Charles Patrick "Ryan" O'Neal.
