= Snoops =

Snoops may refer to:

- Mr. Snoops, one of the antagonists of the movie The Rescuers
- Snoops (1989 TV series)
- Snoops (1999 TV series)
