= Daphne Maxwell Reid =

American actress (born 1948)

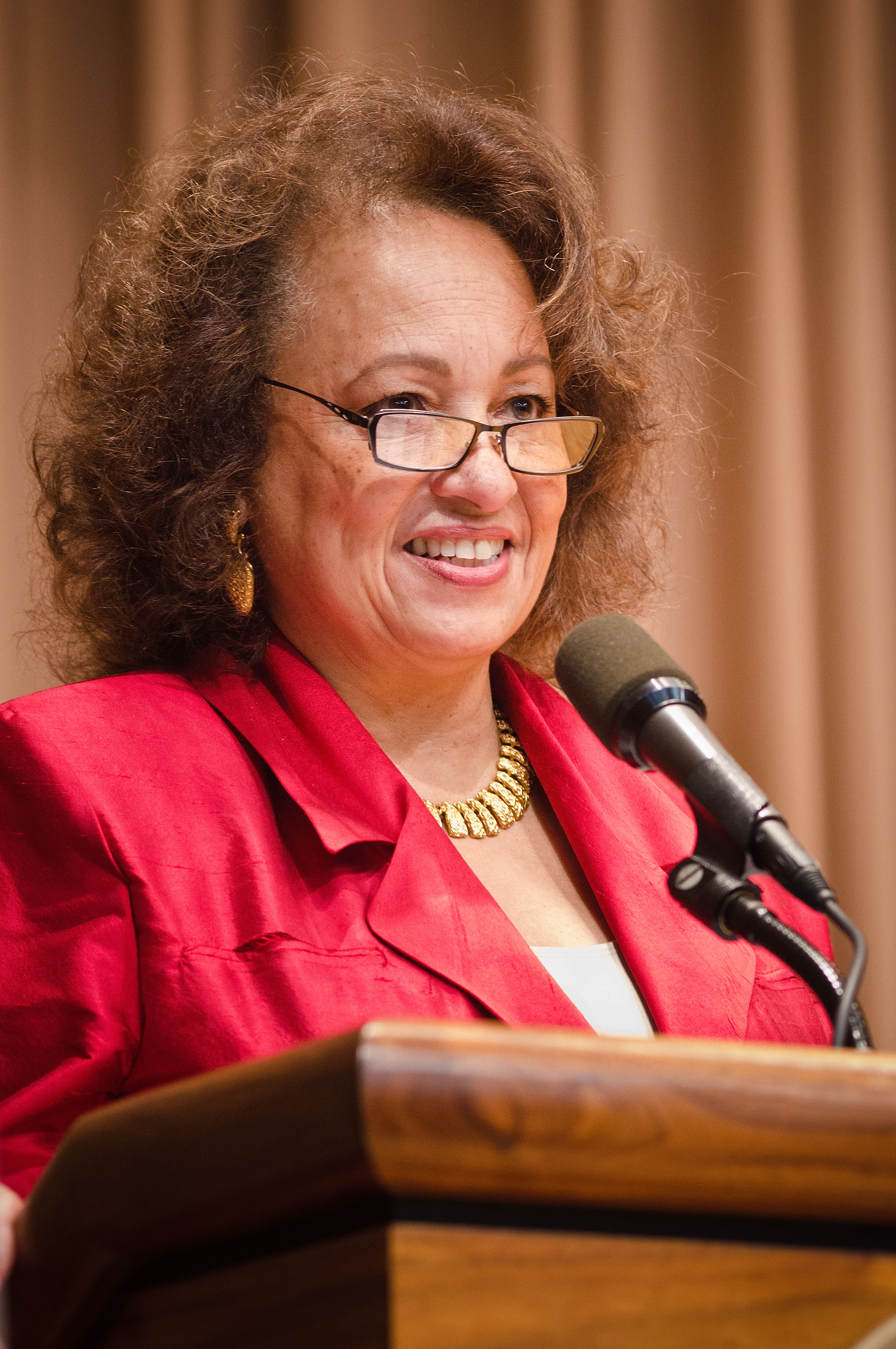
- Reid in 2012
- Born: Daphne Etta Maxwell; July 13, 1948 (age 78); New York City, U.S.
- Education: Northwestern University
- Occupations: Actress, comedian, designer, model
- Years active: 1979–present
- Spouses: Robert Tubbs (m. 1968; div. 1979) Tim Reid (m. 1982)
- Children: 1

Daphne Etta Reid (née Maxwell; July 13, 1948) is an American actress, comedian, designer, and former model. She is known for her role as the second Vivian Banks on the NBC sitcom The Fresh Prince of Bel-Air from 1993 to 1996.

== Early life ==
Reid was born in New York City, United States, the daughter of Rosalee and Green Maxwell. She was raised in the Amsterdam Houses in Lincoln Square, Manhattan.

She is a graduate of The Bronx High School of Science. She received a degree in interior design and architecture from Northwestern University, which she attended on a scholarship and where she became the first African-American woman to be named homecoming queen. While at Northwestern she began a modeling career, eventually signing with Ford Models. She was the first African-American woman to be on the cover of Glamour magazine.

== Career ==
In her early career, Reid appeared in numerous television programs including WKRP in Cincinnati (with husband Tim Reid), The A-Team, Hill Street Blues, T.J. Hooker, Hardcastle and McCormick, Cagney & Lacey, Murder, She Wrote and The Cosby Show.

From 1983-1987, Reid appeared as a recurring character, often with her husband, on the CBS detective series Simon & Simon. The two then starred together on two short-lived CBS shows: Frank's Place (1987-1988) and Snoops (1989-1990).

Her best-known role was as the replacement actress for Vivian Banks on the NBC sitcom The Fresh Prince of Bel-Air from 1993 to 1996, following the departure of Janet Hubert-Whitten. She joined the show right after the fictional character Nicky Banks was born toward the end of Season 3, when Hubert-Whitten did not renew her contract.

She had a recurring role as JT's mother, Frances Hunter, on the UPN sitcom Eve, and then played Juanita Lawrence on the BET sitcom Let's Stay Together.

Reid is also an accomplished photographer as well as a designer and clothing creator.

During the 1980s and 1990s, Reid served on the advisory board of the National Student Film Institute.

She is a recipient of the Women of Vision Award from Women in Film & Video, among a myriad of other awards.

In 2022, she guest stars in the ninth episode of Bel-Air, the dramatic reimagining of Fresh Prince, as Janice, an Art Council executive director.

== Personal life ==
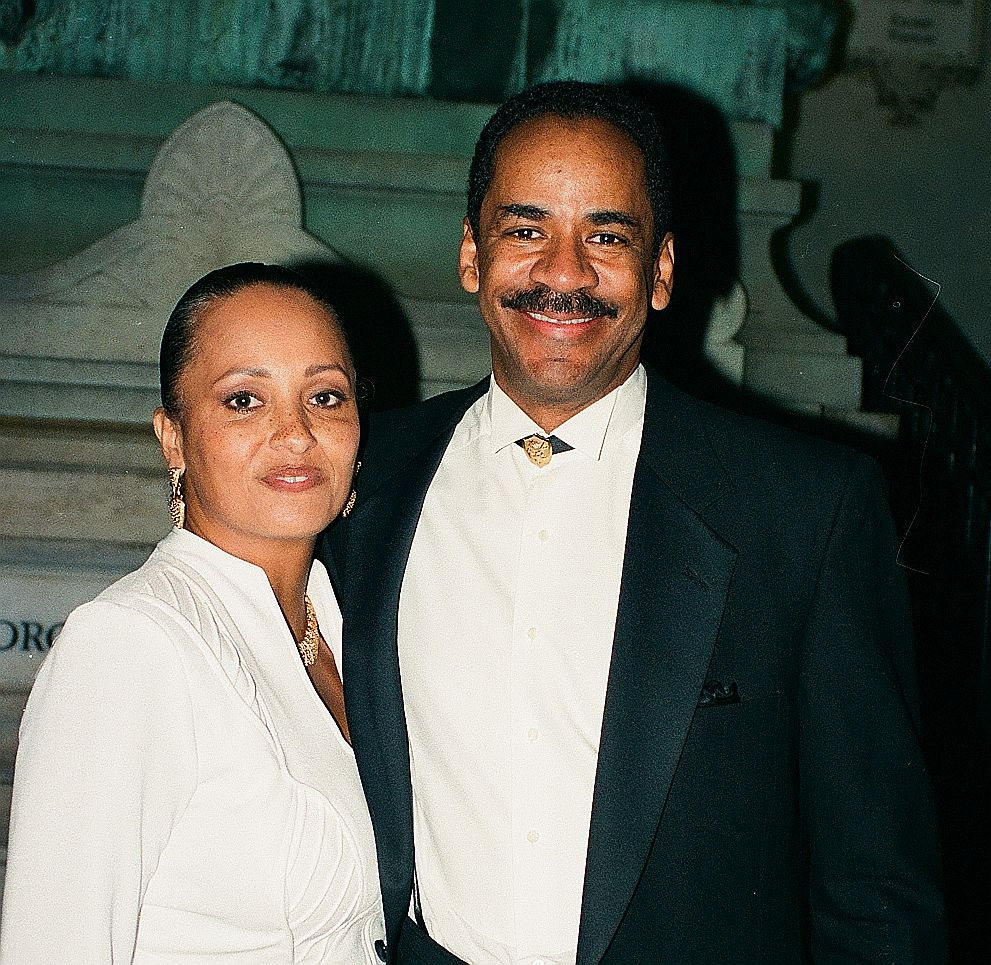
Daphne and Tim Reid in 1997

In 1968, during her junior year at Northwestern, Maxwell married Robert Tubbs. They had one son, Chris, before divorcing in 1979.

She married actor Tim Reid in 1982, and became stepmother to his two children. With Reid, she owned and operated New Millennium Studios in Petersburg, Virginia, until 2014.

She also served on the board of visitors at Virginia State University, for eight years. She was appointed in July 2008.

On July 31, 2010, she became an honorary member of Delta Sigma Theta sorority, during their 50th national convention in New Orleans.

== Filmography ==
=== Film ===
Year	Title	Role	Notes
1984	Protocol	Helene	
1992	Color Adjustment	Herself	Documentary
1995	Once Upon a Time... When We Were Colored	Miss Maxey	Also Second Unit Director
1999	Asunder	Marty's Wife	Also Co-Executive Producer
2002	Paul Mooney: Analyzing White America	—N/a	Documentary (Co-Executive Producer)
2003	For Real	—N/a	Executive Producer
2010	Pantheon Black	Mom	Direct-to-video
2013	Troop 491: the Adventures of the Muddy Lions	Principal Brown	
2015	Living in a Food Desert	Narrator	Documentary
2016	By the Grace of Bob	Nell	
2016	Playing the Duke	Sally	Short film
2018	Out of Gas	Mother	
2019	Harriet	Miz Lucy	
2022	A Jazzman's Blues	Elderly Hattie Mae	

=== Television ===
Year	Title	Role	Notes
1979	The Duke	Unknown role	2 episodes
1979	A Man Called Sloane	Dr. Karla Meredith	"The Shangri-La Syndrome"; Credited as Daphne Maxwell
1980	Coach of the Year	Merissa Lane	TV movie Credited as Daphne Maxwell
1980–1982	WKRP in Cincinnati	Jessica Langtree / Elaine Parker	2 episodes
1981–1986	Hill Street Blues	Kelly Martin / News Anchor / Sheila Roberts	4 episodes
1983	T.J. Hooker	Ellen	"The Shadow of Truth"
1983	Hardcastle and McCormick	Newswoman / Tawnia Grey	3 episodes
1983–1985	The A-Team	Kamora Kaboko / Nurse Lewis	2 episodes
1983–1987	Simon & Simon	Temple Hill	Series regular (16 episodes)
1984	The Duck Factory	Saleswoman	"Filling Buddy's Shoes"
1984	Matt Houston	Mrs. Richards	"Stolen"
1984	Paper Dolls	Nancy	"#1.13"
1985	The Insiders	Unknown role	"Another Fine Mess"
1985	Cagney & Lacey	Noreen Adler	"The Clinic"
1985	The Fall Guy	Unknown role	"Seavers: Dead or Alive"
1986	That's My Mama Now!	Tracy Taylor	TV movie
1987	The Long Journey Home	Joan Haines	TV movie
1987	CBS Summer Playhouse	Host	6 episodes
1987–1988	Frank's Place	Hanna Griffin	Series regular (22 episodes)
1987–1988	Super Password	Herself / Celebrity Contestant	Recurring role (18 episodes)
1987–1989	The New Hollywood Squares	Herself / Panelist	Recurring role (5 episodes)
1988	Murder, She Wrote	Nan Wynn	"The Body Politic"
1989	ABC Afterschool Specials	Judith Daniels	"The Cheats"
1989	Snoops	Micki Dennis	Co Star - 13 episodes
1990	Match Game	Herself / Panelist	Recurring role (5 episodes)
1992	The Cosby Show	Millicent	"Clair's Reunion"
1992	You Must Remember This	Coach Dawson	TV movie
1993–1996	The Fresh Prince of Bel-Air	Vivian Banks	Series regular (74 episodes) (Seasons 4-6)
1994	Will You Marry Me?	Herself	TV movie
1996	Sister, Sister	Charmagne	"Double Exposure"
1998	In the House	Cleopatra "Cleo" Stanton	"My Pest Friend's Wedding"
1998-2000	Linc's	Eartha	14 episodes
2000	Alley Cats Strike	Cathy McLemore	TV movie
2003–2006	Eve	Frances Hunter	Recurring role (6 episodes)
2004	Crossing Jordan	Mrs. Avery	"Justice Delayed"
2005	Slavery and the Making of America	Harriet Jacobs	"Seeds of Destruction"
2007	Polly and Marie	Judge Landers	TV movie
2007	E! True Hollywood Story	Herself / Interviewee	"Will Smith"
2011–2014	Let's Stay Together	Juanita Lawrence	3 episodes
2018–2019	Jacqueline and Jilly	Zillah Stewart	Series regular (6 episodes)
2022–present	Bel-Air	Janice	Episodes: "Can't Knock the Hustle", "Excellence Is Everywhere"

=== Music videos ===
Year	Title	Role	Notes
1981	The Whispers: "It's A Love Thing"	Woman	

Preceded by Janet Hubert	Vivian Banks actress from The Fresh Prince of Bel-Air; 1993 – '95	Succeeded by Cassandra Freeman
