= Venus Flytrap (WKRP in Cincinnati) =

Character on the television situation comedy WKRP in Cincinnati

- WKRP in Cincinnati character
- Portrayed by: Tim Reid

In-universe information
- Gender: Male
- Occupation: disc jockey
- Nationality: American

Venus Flytrap is a character on the television situation comedy WKRP in Cincinnati (1978–82), played by Tim Reid. He is the evening and early night-time disc jockey at WKRP, and during the course of the series he also becomes the assistant program director.

== Development ==
Concerning the shortage of roles for black actors on television in his era, Tim Reid said, "My character is one of very few in television today. It's not just regression, it's a push backward....My character has had some growing pains. My character went against the network's set pattern for a black character." He elaborates that Venus Flytrap "started out as a subordinate character, but he's grown with each episode....I'm a follower of Taoism and I've been able to work some of that into my character. He's relaxed, and sometimes you'll see the yin-yang (opposites that create all) symbol in the background. The character is being seen, but most people still seem to have a problem venturing into what a black person is really like. It would be interesting to go into that character's home."

== Fictional biography ==
=== Background ===
"Venus Flytrap" is the pseudonym used by disc jockey Gordon Sims, the evening DJ at the radio station WKRP. His real name is not revealed until late in the show's first season. The background of his character is complicated, but can be pieced together from various episodes.

Gordon Sims is from New Orleans. His parents were divorced and his grandmother raised him. According to the episode "Venus and the Man" he graduated from Carlisle State Teachers College. In the episode "Sparky", he mentions having played baseball in the minor leagues (at the double-A level) in Texas for a couple of years; however, this is never mentioned again, and from the context of the conversation, it's possible Sims was exaggerating or even fibbing about this experience in order to make a connection with former baseball player/manager Sparky Anderson, who had just been hired at WKRP. (Venus' baseball career never comes up in the episode "Baseball", which centers around the whole staff playing in a softball game against rival station WPIG. Venus plays fairly well in the game, but not at the level one would expect of a former professional amongst amateurs.)

At the age of 22, Sims was drafted into the U. S. Army and served in the Vietnam War. After seeing another soldier called Weird Larry go crazy and commit suicide by jumping out of a helicopter (not to mention the several Viet Cong prisoners thrown out), Gordon had enough of the war and deserted. He had only three weeks remaining on his enlistment, all to be served in the continental United States, where he was to be processed for discharge with no further combat obligations. He spent the next several years hiding out under assumed names, which explains why most of his colleagues at WKRP didn't know his real name at first. While he was on the lam, Gordon became a New Orleans schoolteacher and worked part-time as a disc jockey under the name "The Duke of Funk." He became frustrated with his inability to reach his students (whom he described as "hoodlums") and quit.

Eventually, Venus turned himself in to military officials at the urging of Mr. Carlson (season 1 "Who Is Gordon Sims?"); as he only had a month left when he deserted, Venus was given a general discharge and served out his remaining month, in the words of Andy Travis, "peeling potatoes."

=== WKRP disc jockey ===
Sims accepts an offer from Andy Travis, a friend who was impressed with Gordon's talent as a DJ, to come and be the new evening/night-time man at WKRP, where Andy has just taken over as program director. However, Andy decides that Gordon needs to change his image: new clothes, new style, new name. He convinces a reluctant Gordon to dress in outlandish, multicolored clothes (on the basis that it will help him act cooler and become a better radio personality) and gives him a new name, based in part on the planet that rules his astrological sign: "Venus".

"Venus is a girl's name!" laments Gordon to Andy. "You know, that real white lady with no arms?" When it came time to pick his last name, Gordon simply said "Flytrap". Andy dismisses it as a plant that eats bugs. They come to agreement on "Venus Rising," but Andy slips up when he introduces his new nighttime DJ to the station owner.

Andy lies when he introduces Gordon as "Venus Flytrap" to Mama Carlson, as "the number-one night-time DJ in this country." Venus goes along and tells her that his audience in New Orleans was "the biggest." Mama Carlson's research soon uncovers who Venus really is, but she decides not to say anything. The Flytrap surname, much to Venus' chagrin, sticks.

When station manager Arthur Carlson learns Venus's secret of running from the military, he convinces him to stop running and turn himself in. On the basis of what he went through in the war, as well as the fact that he was near the end of his tour of duty and therefore wouldn't have seen any more combat, the investigating officer decides not to initiate a court-martial but instead recommends a general discharge.

In what some see as a continuity error, when Venus talks about Gordon Sims to Andy, Venus describes "Gordon" to Andy as a friend. However, Andy appears to see right through the deception and knows that Venus is talking about himself. (Although its equally possible Andy already knew Sims real identity, and Sims also knew that Andy knew.) In a future episode "The Creation of Venus", Venus and Andy reminisce with Mama Carlson about when Venus first came to WKRP and when we see them meet (in flashback), Andy knows that Gordon Sims is Venus' real name.

Like Andy, Venus realizes that he cannot leave WKRP ("Venus Rising") for a high paying job offer from WREQ, as he likes the people too much and has made friends. He does negotiate a small raise and a promotion to assistant program director, but also negotiates a small raise to help Herb save face and keep his job.

Like his colleague and friend Dr. Johnny Fever, Venus picks the music himself. (Despite Johnny and Venus being on the air in time slots that do not overlap or abut, they are frequently seen together at the WKRP studios.) His evening program largely follows a Quiet Storm format; he plays a lot of contemporary hits by artists like Kenny Loggins ("This is It") and Earth, Wind and Fire ("After the Love Has Gone"), but he also sometimes violates Andy's rock n' roll format by playing jazz music like "Remembering the Rain" by Bill Evans. His style as a DJ is smooth, soft-spoken and sexy; he calls his listeners "my children" (something he makes up after he accidentally addresses his listeners as if they were a classroom full of students) and says things like "This is Venus Flytrap, here to brighten, tighten and enlighten your starlight hours." He sometimes punctuates his statements by banging a small gong, and he turns down the lights in the broadcast booth in order to create a more mellow mood for his broadcasts.

Venus also takes advantage of his working hours—he's on the air after almost everyone else at the station has gone home—to entertain women in the broadcast booth. This gets him into trouble eventually, as one of these women (played by Tim Reid's real-life future wife Daphne Maxwell Reid) later is arrested as a conspirator in a jewelry robbery. To save her own skin, she fingers Venus, who bears a strong resemblance to the real robber. Venus is in jail for about a week until the real robber (briefly played by Reid via a split screen effect) is finally arrested.

== Depiction ==
=== Personal life ===
Despite the way he dresses and his occasional use of 1970s vernacular slang like "what's happening," Venus is actually one of the more straitlaced members of the WKRP staff. He is somewhat conservative on social issues; he is against "hard drugs," sometimes expresses disapproval over the sexual content in modern song lyrics and television shows ("I saw, at eight o'clock, two adults arguing about abortion -- now, is that right?"), and his theory of parenting is that "there's nothing wrong with [discipline] as long as it's tempered with love." And unlike the perpetually cash-strapped Johnny, Venus is good at managing money; he is very knowledgeable about playing the stock market. In the episode "Three Days of the Condo", Venus convinces Johnny to purchase real estate after winning a sizable settlement.

Also unlike Johnny, who is more or less content being a DJ, Venus is determined to go on to bigger things: "I can't spin records all my life." When he turns 30 in the second season, he looks at his wardrobe and asks himself "does a grown man dress like this?" Wanting to make more of his career, he considers accepting the job of program director at WKRP's urban contemporary-formatted competitor, WREQ, an all-automated station where all the programming decisions are made from corporate headquarters. He turns down the job when he finds out that the station only wants him so it can have a token black employee. He eventually succeeds in his ambitions and, by the time of his guest appearance on The New WKRP in Cincinnati, has become a chief executive officer at another media company.

Venus is close to both Andy Travis (the two having been friends prior to working at WKRP) and fellow DJ Johnny Fever (Venus offers Fever financial and personal advice, and Fever is close enough to Venus to crack friendly jokes about Venus' "blackness" at times when the issue became of concern to Venus, helping to ease Venus' feelings that sometimes he was falling out of touch with black culture). Venus also has a strong friendship with Bailey Quarters and often flirts with Jennifer Marlowe in the same manner as Johnny (namely, in a friendly and humorous fashion).

=== Racial issues ===
Working at a station where all the other employees are white, Venus sometimes worries that he is losing touch with black culture. There are a number of jokes that play on the fact that Venus is rather "white" in his cultural tastes: Dr. Johnny Fever sometimes seems to know more about black performers than Venus does, and in the episode "Daydreams," when Venus imagines what he would like to be, he becomes a bland, unctuous Las Vegas stand-up comedian in the style of Joey Bishop. In the episode "Real Families," Venus is stunned to find out that co-worker Herb Tarlek has tried to score points with the titular TV series by claiming that he and Venus attend NAACP meetings together.

In the episode "Changes," when Venus learns that he is going to be interviewed by a reporter from a militant black magazine, he fears that the article will expose the fact that "All I know [about black culture] is what I see on The Jeffersons." He tries to fool the interviewer by adopting what he thinks of as a more typically African-American wardrobe and way of speaking. To his surprise, the reporter (Reid's former standup comedy partner Tom Dreesen) turns out to be white: the only white employee at an otherwise all-black magazine. Before the interview starts, the reporter explains his situation, which parallels Venus's exactly, and pours out his feelings and, by extension, Venus's: he cares for the people he works with, but he feels a little uncomfortable at being the odd man out. The reporter laments that there are two gorgeous women co-workers, but because they are black and he is white, he doesn't feel he could ever ask them out; Venus does his best to look nonchalant at the humorous inversion of his own situation.

Another episode dealing with racial issues is "A Family Affair," whose script is credited to Tim Reid. The episode touches on the relationship between Venus and Andy: they are friends who like to assume that they have "put all that black-white junk behind us," but when Venus goes out with Andy's sister Carol, Andy gets angry without fully being able to explain why. In the end, Andy has to grudgingly admit over drinks that there was a racial motivation to the way he reacted, and goes overboard trying to prove that he does not, in fact, object to Venus dating his sister, forcing the two of them to dance together at the bar just so he can show that he doesn't have a problem with it. Andy and Venus finally patch up their differences by teaming up to punch out an unapologetic racist objecting to Carol and Venus dancing.

A very popular episode focusing on Venus is "Venus and the Man" (originally called "Venus Flytrap Explains the Atom"), an episode written by series creator and showrunner Hugh Wilson. In it, Cora Isley, the station's cleaning woman, tells Venus that her son Arnold (Keny Long) is planning to drop out of high school, and Venus offers to talk to the boy.

Arnold comes to the station to see Venus, and turns out to be the huge, muscular leader of a street gang. Venus has to figure out how to make him believe that education is worthwhile when Arnold is already making more money than he could at any "respectable" job. He explains to Arnold that everything in life is a matter of either "survival" or "conquest," and that Arnold, who is mostly interested in conquest, hates school because it has "conquered" him. Arnold admits that he hates the feeling of being weak and powerless that he gets when he can't understand something in school, but Venus offers to prove to him that it doesn't have to be that way: he bets that he can teach Arnold the basics of the atom in two minutes, and Arnold agrees to go back to school and finish out the year if he can.

In a memorable sequence, Venus explains the structure of the atom by pretending that the protons, neutrons and electrons are rival gangs competing for control of a neighborhood that consists of "block after block of nothing." Before Arnold realizes it, he is able to recite all the features of an atom. He then admits that it feels good to know something most other people don't, and Venus explains that the learning is itself a form of conquest. Arnold keeps his part of the bargain and goes back to school, but Venus warns Cora that the odds are against Arnold continuing in school after the year is out. The episode is also a moment of triumph for Venus, who proves himself as a teacher (a profession he failed at earlier) and earns the respect of a boy who had accused him of "sounding white" on the air.

== The New WKRP ==
Venus appeared in one episode of the "revival" series, The New WKRP in Cincinnati. "Venus, We Hardly Knew Ya" reveals that Venus left his position as the night time DJ at WKRP around 1985, and has since become a successful broadcasting executive with BET, dropping his on-air alias in favor of his real name of Gordon Sims. He initially is not very interested in talking about or remembering his years as Venus Flytrap, having left this persona at the station, but eventually comes to develop a nostalgic fondness for that time in his life. This episode was written and directed by Max Tash, who was a stage manager and associate producer for the entire run of the original series.
