= Snoops (1989 TV series) =

- Genre: Crime drama Comedy drama Police comedy
- Created by: Sam Egan; Tim Reid
- Written by: Sam Egan; Joe Menosky
- Directed by: Ray Austin; Roy Campanella II; Peter Crane; Ivan Dixon; Roger Duchowny; James Fargo; Helaine Head; Burt Kennedy; Gilbert Moses; Sam Weisman
- Starring: Tim Reid; Daphne Maxwell Reid; Tasha Scott; Tracy Camilla Johns; John Karlen; Troy Curvey, Jr. Tim Reid II; Adam Silbar; Lynn Whitfield; Raymond St. Jacques; Barbara McNair
- Original language: English
- No. of seasons: 1
- No. of episodes: 13

Production
- Executive producers: Sam Egan; George Geiger; Tim Reid
- Producers: Jo Perry; Thomas Perry; Sascha Schneider
- Production companies: Tima Love Productions; Solt/Egan Company; Viacom Productions

Original release
- Network: CBS
- Release: September 22, 1989 – July 6, 1990

Snoops is an American crime themed comedy-drama television series which aired for one season (13 episodes) from September 22, 1989 to July 6, 1990 on CBS. The series was created and executive produced by series star Tim Reid and Sam Egan.

== Synopsis ==
The series centers around a criminologist and his wife and the comedic situations in which they found themselves embroiled in solving various crimes. The show starred real-life married couple Tim Reid and Daphne Maxwell Reid as well as child actress Tasha Scott.

== Cast ==
- Tim Reid as Chance Dennis, Jr.
- Daphne Maxwell Reid as Micki Dennis
- Tasha Scott as Katja Dennis, Chance's daughter from a previous marriage
- Tracy Camilla Johns as Yolanda
- John Karlen as Lieutenant Sam Akers, a lieutenant with the Washington, D.C. Police Department
- Troy Curvey, Jr. as Hugo
- Tim Reid II as Jason
- Adam Silbar as Doug
- Lynn Whitfield as Denise Kendall, Chance's sister
- Raymond St. Jacques as General Ben, Chance's dad
- Barbara McNair as Virginia Martin, Chance's mom

== Episodes ==
No.	Title	Directed by	Written by	Original release date
1	"Hotshot"	Burt Kennedy	Sam Egan	September 22, 1989
2	"Close Shave"	Burt Kennedy	Story by : Tim Reid; Teleplay by : Lee Sheldon	September 29, 1989
3	"The Big, Brass Cookie Jar"	Roger Duchowny	Lee Sheldon	October 6, 1989
4	"Mr. Dennis' Neighborhood"	Ray Austin	Jo & Thomas Perry	October 13, 1989
5	"Remember When"	Roy Campanella II	Sam Egan	October 20, 1989
6	"A Pretty Girl is Like a Malady"	Sam Weisman	Sam Egan	October 27, 1989
7	"The Sagittarian Candidate"	Peter Crane	Jo & Thomas Perry	November 10, 1989
8	"Bad Thing in a Small Package"	Helanie Head	Story by : Delle Chatman; Teleplay by : Lee Shelon & Delle Chapman	November 17, 1989
9	"Twice Dead"	Ivan Dixon	Sam Egan	December 1, 1989
10	"Tango, Dance of Death"	Gilbert Moses	Lee Sheldon	December 8, 1989
11	"Someone to Lay Down Beside Me"	Ivan Dixon	George Geiger	June 22, 1990
12	"Don't Try This at Home"	James Fargo	Joe Menosky	June 29, 1990
13	"Rough Justice"	Ray Austin	Lee Sheldon	July 6, 1990
