= Paul Mooney (comedian) =

American writer and entertainer (1941–2021)

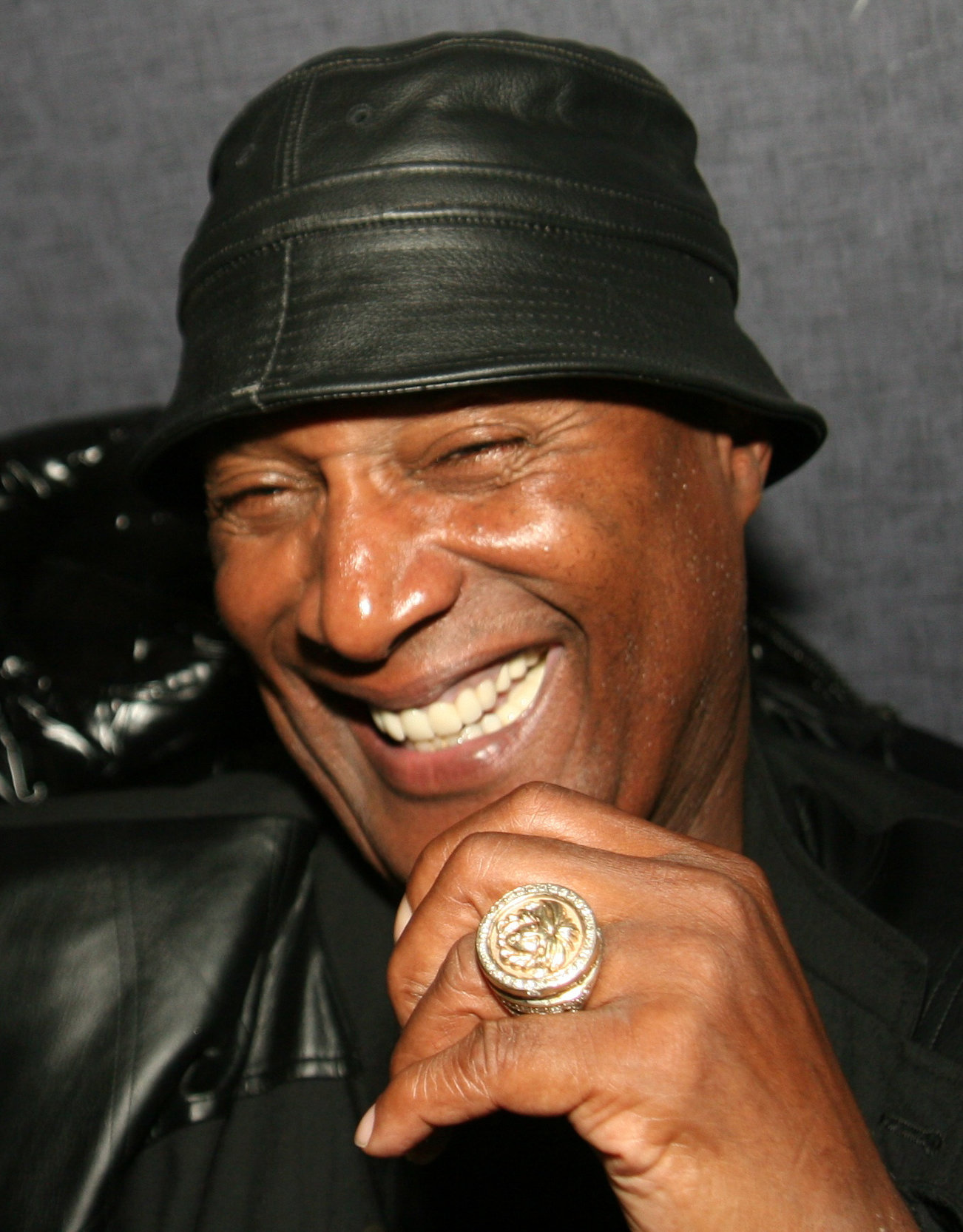
- Mooney in 2009
- Born: Paul Gladney; August 4, 1941; Shreveport, Louisiana, U.S.
- Died: May 19, 2021 (aged 79); Oakland, California, U.S.
- Notable work: Sam Cooke in The Buddy Holly Story; Junebug in Bamboozled; Negrodamus in Chappelle's Show

Comedy career
- Years active: 1962–2021
- Medium: Stand-up comedy, television, film, books
- Genres: Observational comedy, improvisational comedy, sketch comedy
- Subjects: African-American history, African-American culture, American politics, identity politics, current events, racism, race relations, pop culture

Paul Gladney (August 4, 1941 – May 19, 2021), better known by the stage name Paul Mooney, was an American comedian, writer, and actor. He collaborated with Redd Foxx, Eddie Murphy and Dave Chappelle, wrote for comedian Richard Pryor and the television series Sanford and Son, In Living Color and Chappelle's Show, and acted in The Buddy Holly Story (1978), the Spike Lee-directed satirical film Bamboozled (2000), and Chappelle's Show.

== Early life ==
Mooney was born in 1941 in Shreveport, Louisiana, and moved to Oakland, California, seven years later. His parents were George Gladney and LaVoya Ealy. Mooney was raised primarily by his grandmother Aimay Ealy, known among the family as "Mama". Gladney coined the nickname "Mooney" after the original Scarface (1932) actor Paul Muni (which itself was the actor's stage name).

== Career ==
Mooney became a ringmaster with the Gatti-Charles Circus. During his stint as ringmaster, he always found himself writing comedy and telling jokes, which later helped Mooney land his first professional work as a writer for Richard Pryor.

Mooney's childhood friends, gospel folk duo Joe and Eddie, first made him aware of Richard Pryor in the mid-1960s after seeing him perform in New York City.

Mooney wrote some of Pryor's routines for his 1975 appearance on Saturday Night Live; co-wrote his material for Pryor's albums ...Is It Something I Said? (1975), Bicentennial Nigger (1976), and Live on the Sunset Strip (1982); and co-wrote the screenplay of Pryor's 1986 film Jo Jo Dancer, Your Life Is Calling. As the head writer for The Richard Pryor Show, he gave many young comics, such as Robin Williams, Sandra Bernhard, Marsha Warfield, John Witherspoon, and Tim Reid, their first break into show business.

Mooney also wrote for Redd Foxx's Sanford and Son and Good Times, acted in several cult classics including the Richard Pryor comedy films Which Way Is Up?, Bustin' Loose, and the cult satirical comedy Hollywood Shuffle, and portrayed singer/songwriter Sam Cooke in The Buddy Holly Story.

He was the head writer for the first year of Fox's In Living Color, inspiring the character Homey D. Clown, played by Damon Wayans. Mooney later went on to play Wayans' father in the Spike Lee-directed film Bamboozled as the comedian Junebug.

Mooney initially appeared in the sketches "Ask a Black Dude" and "Mooney at the Movies" on Comedy Central's Chappelle's Show. He later appeared as Negrodamus, an African American version of Nostradamus. As Negrodamus, Mooney ad-libbed the "answers to life's most unsolvable mysteries" such as "Why do white people love Wayne Brady?" (answer: "Because Wayne Brady makes Bryant Gumbel look like Malcolm X"). Mooney was planning to reprise his role as Negrodamus in the third season of the Chappelle's Show, before Dave Chappelle left the show due to creative and contractual differences.

In 2006, Mooney hosted the BET tribute to Black History Month titled 25 Most @#%! Moments in Black History. In this show, he narrated some of the most shameful incidents involving African Americans since 1980. The top 25 moments included incidents involving Marion Barry, Terrell Owens, Wilson Goode, Michael Jackson, Flavor Flav, Whitney Houston, and Tupac Shakur.

In 2007, Mooney released his first book, the memoir Black Is the New White.

In November 2014, Paul's brother announced that Mooney had prostate cancer. Mooney continued to tour, and perform his stand-up comedy act.

=== BET Comedy Awards ===
In September 2005, Mooney performed a segment at the 2005 BET Comedy Awards called the "Black People Wake Up Call Award", in which he jokingly presents an award to African American celebrities who neglected their blackness to try to blend in with Caucasians, only to find out they're still a "n-word " in their eyes. The "nominees" included Michael Jackson, Oprah Winfrey, Lil' Kim, and Diana Ross. Mooney awarded Ross and made numerous jokes about Ross's 2002 arrest for DUI. According to people who were in attendance, Mooney also made light of the death of Ross's ex-husband Arne Næss Jr., who fell while mountain climbing in 2004. Tracee Ellis Ross, Ross's daughter and Næss's stepdaughter, was also in attendance. She reportedly was so offended and embarrassed that she left the room. Backstage in the press room, Mooney was asked if he felt his performance was "over the top". Mooney replied:

How can somebody get arrested for (being under the influence) and go to jail and I be over the top? I think that's over the top, don't you? Agree or disagree, folks. No, comedy is not over the top. When you are a celebrity and you do crazy stuff, that's the game.

When Mooney was informed that Tracee Ellis Ross was in the audience, he stated:

I didn't know ... her mama could've been in there, that's not the point. I didn't drive drunk. Now I'm responsible for Diana Ross? If you scrutinize Jay Leno and David Letterman the same way you scrutinize me, then I'll agree with you, but if you don't touch them white folks don't touch me. They say whatever they want to say every night.

The majority of Mooney's performance was edited out of the televised broadcast and not aired.

=== The N-word ===
On November 26, 2006, Mooney appeared on CNN and talked about how he would stop using the word "nigga" due to Michael Richards's outbursts on stage at the Laugh Factory. He referred to Richards as having become "his Dr. Phil" and "cured" him of the use of the epithet.

On November 30, Mooney elaborated upon these remarks from his appearance on CNN as a guest of Farai Chideya on the National Public Radio program News & Notes. He declared that he would convene a conference on this controversial subject in the near future, as well as perform his first "n-free" comedy in the upcoming days.

That show, which he performed at the Lincoln Theater following a set by Dick Gregory, took place on December 2, 2006. Mooney almost made it through his entire set—about an hour of jokes—before he mistakenly used the word in a routine on O. J. Simpson. He ran off stage covering his face in his hands, and walked back on a few moments later saying, "I'm really going to get it now. This is probably already on the Internet." On the BET special 25 Events that Mis-Shaped Black America, Mooney reiterated that he was no longer using the word. He was quoted as saying, "I am no longer going to use the n-word. Instead of saying 'What's up, my nigga,' say 'What's up, my Michael Richards.'" At a summit with Jesse Jackson, Reverend Al Sharpton and Richards, Mooney forgave Richards.

== Personal life ==
Comedian Paul Mooney had five children: twin sons Dwayne and Daryl, another son Shane, a daughter Spring, and another son Symeon.

- Dwayne and Daryl Mooney: Twin sons from a relationship prior to his marriage to Yvonne Carothers. They are comedians known as the "Mooney Twins" and have carried on their father's legacy.
- Shane Mooney: A son from his marriage to Yvonne Carothers, whom he married in 1973.
- Spring Mooney: A daughter born after his divorce from Yvonne.
- Symeon Bujould Mooney: Another son who died in a car accident in 2001.

In a 2019 tweet, Mooney mentioned, "My best friends are my children... all four of them" (referring to the four surviving children at the time). His daughter Spring tweeted a heartfelt tribute following his death in 2021, saying her world was "forever SHOOK"

In an August 2019 interview with Comedy Hype, Richard Pryor's ex-bodyguard, Rashon Khan, alleged that Mooney had a sexual relationship with Pryor's son, Richard Pryor Jr., and "violated" him when Pryor Jr. was a minor. Khan also alleged that Pryor wanted to organize a contract killing against Mooney in retaliation and was willing to pay $1 million for one, but was only prevented from doing so by his 1980 fire incident. Richard Pryor Jr. has confirmed he was raped as a teenager, but did not mention Mooney by name as his alleged rapist.

== Death ==
On May 19, 2021, Mooney died of a heart attack at his home in Oakland, California, at the age of 79.

== Filmography ==
=== Film ===
Year	Title	Role	Notes
1970	Carter's Army	Soldier	uncredited
1972	F.T.A.	Himself	documentary
1977	Which Way Is Up?	Inspector	
1978	The Buddy Holly Story	Sam Cooke	
1981	Bustin' Loose	Marvin	
1985	Brewster's Millions		Production consultant
1986	Jo Jo Dancer, Your Life Is Calling		Writer
1987	Hollywood Shuffle	President of NAACP	
1994	The Legend of Dolemite	Himself	
1994	In the Army Now	Lt. Col. Peter Hume	
1998	High Freakquency	Love Doctor	
2000	Bamboozled	Junebug	
2001	The Old Settler	Man at Counter	
2001	Call Me Claus		Writer
2002	The Ketchup King	Padro Buyers	
2003	DysFunktional Family		Consultant
2003	Bitter Jester	Himself	documentary
2004	The N-Word	Himself	documentary
2002	Paul Mooney: Analyzing White America	Himself	
2006	Know Your History: Jesus Is Black; So Was Cleopatra	Himself	
2007	Homie Spumoni	George	
2009	Good Hair	Himself	documentary
2010	It's the End of the World	Himself	
2012	The Godfather of Comedy	Himself	
2014	Hidden Colors 3: The Rules of Racism	Himself	
2016	Meet the Blacks	Klansman	

=== Television ===
Year	Title	Role	Notes
1972	Sanford and Son		Writer; 3 episodes
1974	Good Times		Writer
1975	Saturday Night Live		Writer; Episode: "Richard Pryor/Gil Scott-Heron"
1977	The Richard Pryor Show	Actor	Writer; 4 episodes
1984	Pryor's Place		Writer; 4 episodes
1990–94	In Living Color		Writer; 16 episodes
1995	The Larry Sanders Show	Clyde	Episode: "Beverly and the Prop Job"
2003	Chappelle's Show	Negrodamus	Actor; 2 episodes Writer; 3 episodes
2004	Judge Mooney	Judge Mooney	Actor/Writer; 7 episodes

== Stand-up ==
- Race (StepSun Music/Tommy Boy, 1993) CD
- Master Piece (StepSun Music, 1994) CD
- Black People Built The Pyramids on YouTube (2001) TV
- Analyzing White America (SHOUT! Factory/Sony Music Video, 2004) DVD
- Know Your History: Jesus Is Black; So Was Cleopatra (QD3 Entertainment, 2006) DVD
- It's the End of the World (2010) DVD
- Shaquille O' Neal's All Star Comedy Jam (2010) TV
- The Godfather of Comedy (2012) TV

== Biography ==
In his book Black Is the New White, Mooney talks about his partnership with Richard Pryor, from their first meeting to Pryor's death in 2005. Mooney reflects on his childhood and some of the most notorious moments in his life, including organizing a performers' strike on the Comedy Store and publicly giving up the n-word after Michael Richards' onstage outburst. It features a foreword written by Dave Chappelle.
