= Frank's Place =

American comedy-drama television series

- Genre: Comedy drama
- Created by: Hugh Wilson
- Written by: Richard Dubin; David Chambers; Samm-Art Williams; Hugh Wilson
- Directed by: Neema Barnette; Richard Dubin; Stan Lathan; Max Tash; Hugh Wilson
- Starring: Tim Reid; Daphne Maxwell Reid; Tony Burton; Virginia Capers; Robert Harper
- Theme music composer: Louis Alter; Eddie DeLange
- Opening theme: "Do You Know What It Means to Miss New Orleans?" performed by Louis Armstrong
- Composer: Richard Kosinski
- Country of origin: United States
- Original language: English
- No. of seasons: 1
- No. of episodes: 22

Production
- Executive producers: Tim Reid; Hugh Wilson
- Producers: Max Tash; David Chambers; Richard Dubin
- Camera setup: Single-camera
- Running time: 22–24 minutes
- Production company: Viacom Productions

Original release
- Network: CBS
- Release: September 14, 1987 – March 22, 1988

Frank's Place is an American comedy-drama series that aired on CBS for 22 episodes during the 1987–1988 television season. The series was created by Hugh Wilson and executive produced by Wilson and series star and fellow WKRP in Cincinnati alumnus Tim Reid.

TV Guide ranked it No. 3 on its 2013 list of 60 shows that were "Cancelled Too Soon". Rolling Stone ranked it No. 99 on its list of the best sitcoms of the television era.

== Plot ==
Set in New Orleans, Frank's Place chronicles the life of Frank Parrish (Tim Reid), a well-to-do African-American professor in Boston who inherits a restaurant, Chez Louisiane. In the premiere, Frank travels to New Orleans intending to sell the restaurant. However, waitress Miss Marie (Frances E. Williams), has a voodoo spin (curse) put on Frank ensuring that he will come back to carry on his family's business. Consequently, when Frank returns to New England, the life he's known there suddenly goes inexplicably haywire. Feeling he has no choice, Frank returns to New Orleans and makes many discoveries about black culture in New Orleans, the differences between northern and southern lifestyles, and himself.

On its surface, Frank's Place was a fish-out-of-water story, like The Beverly Hillbillies or Green Acres. However, the series' story lines featured weightier topics such as race and class issues.

== Cast and characters ==
- Tim Reid as Frank Parrish
- Daphne Maxwell Reid (Tim Reid's real-life wife) as Hanna Griffin
- Tony Burton as Big Arthur
- Virginia Capers as Mrs. Bertha Griffin-Lamour
- Robert Harper as Bubba Weisberger
- Lincoln Kilpatrick as Reverend Deal
- Charles Lampkin as Tiger Shepin
- Francesca P. Roberts as Anna Mae
- Don Yesso as Shorty La Roux
- William Thomas Jr. as Cool Charles
- Frances E. Williams as Miss Marie, oldest living waitress
- Wayne Woodson as Happy Dinner Guest

== Production ==
The idea for the series came from CBS vice president, Gregg Maday. As a young man, Maday frequented a restaurant in Buffalo, New York named Dan Montgomery's. Maday also wanted a series based in New Orleans due to the mid-1980s interest in Cajun cuisine and zydeco. The two ideas were combined. Wilson and Reid spent time in New Orleans for research. They found a restaurant named Chez Helene, and many of the things they encountered there were included in the series. Big Arthur was based on Chez Helene's owner, Austin Leslie. The series focused more on Creole cuisine and Creole culture rather than Cajun.

Don Yesso was a real-life New Orleans native whom Wilson met on a flight to the city. Yesso was not an actor, but Wilson cast him because of his genuine Yat dialect.

Unlike most sitcom productions of the era, Frank's Place was filmed with a single camera and used no laugh track.

=== Theme song ===
The series theme song was Louis Armstrong's classic "Do You Know What It Means To Miss New Orleans?". Licensing the song for the show cost an estimated $2,300 per episode during the show's original broadcast.

== Episodes ==
No.	Title	Directed by	Written by	Original release date
1	"Pilot"	Hugh Wilson	Hugh Wilson	September 14, 1987
Brown University professor Frank Parrish inherits his estranged father's New Orleans restaurant, Chez Louisiane.
2	"Frank Returns"	Hugh Wilson	Hugh Wilson	September 21, 1987
A voodoo "spin" compels Frank to return to New Orleans and run the Chez.
3	"Frank Takes Charge"	Stan Lathan	David Chambers	September 28, 1987
Frank tries to get the hang of running a restaurant.
4	"The Bridge"	Hugh Wilson	Hugh Wilson	October 5, 1987
A man drives his truck off a bridge and dies after drinking at the Chez. A high-powered lawyer (Conchata Ferrell) with connections to the dead man's wife (Beah Richards) announces her intention to sue Frank for everything he's got.
5	"Frank Joins the Club"	Neema Barnette	Samm-Art Williams	October 12, 1987
Frank is recruited to be the token dark-skinned member of a club for light-skinned black people.
6	"Eligible Bachelor"	Stan Lathan	Pamela Douglas	October 19, 1987
Frank finds himself newly popular with women.
7	"Disengaged"	Max Tash	David Chambers	October 26, 1987
Hanna breaks off her engagement.
8	"Cool and the Gang: Part 1"	Hugh Wilson	Richard Dubin	November 9, 1987
Cool Charles is offered a part-time job by a 16-year-old boss.
9	"Cool and the Gang: Part 2"	Hugh Wilson	Richard Dubin	November 16, 1987
Cool Charles's friends get concerned about his involvement with gang life.
10	"The Reverend Gets a Flock"	Neema Barnette	David Chambers	November 23, 1987
The Reverend Deal gets a new job opportunity of his own.
11	"I.O.U."	Roy Campanella II	Samm-Art Williams	November 30, 1987
Frank is told that he's going to have to pay off his father's old gambling debts – or else.
12	"Food Fight"	Hugh Wilson	Richard Dubin	December 7, 1987
A dispute over recipes is settled by a boxing match between the chefs of the Chez and a rival restaurant.
13	"Season's Greetings"	Helaine Head	Story by : Don Yesso; Teleplay by : Hugh Wilson	December 14, 1987
Frank goes to Bubba's family's place for a Hanukkah party, where Bubba pretends that he and Frank are lovers.
14	"The Bum Out Front"	Frank Bonner	Hugh Wilson	January 4, 1988
Frank develops an unusual relationship with a vagrant who lives outside the Chez and refuses to leave.
15	"Dueling Voodoo"	Richard Dubin	David Chambers	January 11, 1988
To get rid of a tenant who appears to have voodoo powers, Frank enlists the help of the voodoo expert who cursed him.
16	"Where's Ed?"	Hugh Wilson	Hugh Wilson	January 18, 1988
Tiger's buddies steal the corpse of an old friend and bring it to the Chez, and the body winds up in the restaurant's freezer just as the health inspector is visiting.
17	"Night Business"	Max Tash	Hugh Wilson	February 3, 1988
Frank hires a consultant to help the Chez improve its business and get a broader range of customers.
18	"Shorty's Belle"	Max Tash	Craig Nelson	February 15, 1988
Shorty tries to help a Southern damsel in distress.
19	"Frank's Place – The Movie"	Hugh Wilson	Story by : Hugh Wilson & Tim Reid; Teleplay by : Hugh Wilson	February 22, 1988
A film director (Daniel Davis) uses the Chez as a set for a movie, and Frank has a shot with the movie's leading lady (Pam Grier).
20	"Cultural Exchange"	Kevin Rodney Sullivan	Samm-Art Williams	March 7, 1988
A group of African musicians visits New Orleans, and one of them is so impressed by Dizzy Gillespie that he wants to stay in America and play jazz.
21	"The Recruiting Game"	Richard Dubin	David Chambers	March 15, 1988
Frank helps a high-school basketball star field offers from various colleges.
22	"The King of Wall Street"	Asaad Kelada	Samm-Art Williams	March 22, 1988
While eating dinner at the Chez, a Wall Street tycoon learns that he's been the victim of a hostile takeover.

== Awards and nominations ==
Award	Category	Nominee(s)	Result	Ref.
Artios Awards	Best Comedy Episodic Casting	Deborah Barylski	Nominated	
Golden Globe Awards	Best Television Series – Musical or Comedy		Nominated	
Humanitas Prize	30 Minute Network or Syndicated Television	Hugh Wilson (for "The Bridge")	Won	
NAACP Image Awards	Outstanding Actor in a Comedy Series	Tim Reid	Won	
NAACP Image Awards	Outstanding Actress in a Comedy Series	Daphne Maxwell Reid	Nominated	
NAACP Image Awards	Outstanding Actress in a Comedy Series	Frances E. Williams	Nominated	
Primetime Emmy Awards	Outstanding Comedy Series	David Chambers, Richard Dubin, Tim Reid, Max Tash, Samm-Art Williams, and Hugh Wilson	Nominated	
Primetime Emmy Awards	Outstanding Lead Actor in a Comedy Series	Tim Reid (for "The Bridge")	Nominated	
Primetime Emmy Awards	Outstanding Guest Performer in a Comedy Series	Beah Richards (for "The Bridge")	Won	
Primetime Emmy Awards	Outstanding Writing for a Comedy Series	Hugh Wilson (for "The Bridge")	Won	
Primetime Emmy Awards	Outstanding Art Direction for a Series	Jacqueline Webber and Daniel Loren May (for "Cool and the Gang: Part 2")	Nominated	
Primetime Emmy Awards	Outstanding Editing for a Series (Single Camera Production)	Marsh Hendry and Robert Souders (for "Food Fight")	Nominated	
Primetime Emmy Awards	Outstanding Individual Achievement in Costuming for a Series	Pat Welch (for "Frank Returns")	Nominated	
Primetime Emmy Awards	Outstanding Individual Achievement in Hairstyling for a Series	Ora Green (for "Dueling Voodoo")	Nominated	
Primetime Emmy Awards	Outstanding Sound Mixing for a Comedy Series or a Special	Michael Ballin, Martin P. Church, Lenora Peterson, and M. Curtis Price (for "Food Fight")	Won	
Television Critics Association Awards	Program of the Year		Nominated	
Television Critics Association Awards	Outstanding Achievement in Comedy		Won (Note: Tied with The Wonder Years.)	
Viewers for Quality Television Awards	Best Actor in a Quality Comedy Series	Tim Reid	Won	

== Cancellation ==
Frank's Place was cancelled after one season. Despite its strong beginning, ratings for Frank's Place declined. Viewers were reportedly puzzled by the show's changing timeslot and by how the show's style eschewed the traditional sitcom format. The show's large ensemble and film-style techniques made production costly. Wilson remarked that: "We just didn’t please the Nielsen monster."

Tim Reid was later told by CBS board member Walter Cronkite that the show was cancelled because Laurence Tisch, the network's CEO at the time, was upset by the episode "The King of Wall Street." Tisch, who bought CBS via junk bonds, viewed the episode as an insult since it depicted a Wall Street tycoon condemning junk bonds. As a result, Tisch demanded that the show be cancelled despite the objections of Cronkite and other board members.

== Syndication ==
Reruns aired on BET in 1990.

== Home media ==
In October 2008, CNN.com reported that because of music licensing issues, a DVD release would be unlikely. However, on November 10, 2008, The Times-Picayune reported that plans were underway for an eventual DVD release, although Tim Reid has said that, due to the prohibitive costs of the music rights, a new musical score will be recorded that will "recreate the mood of the music." He adds, "it has to be the mood of the show or I'd rather not do it."

However, the DVD was never produced. After a private screening of select episodes in 2011, Reid commented that music licensing costs "would cost more...now than it would to pay for all the actors that we had".
