= Roommates (TV series) =

- The cast of Roommates.
- Created by: Robin French; Matt Green; Kieron Quirke
- Developed by: Robin French; Kieron Quirke
- Written by: Robin French; Kieron Quirke; Ryan Christopher Mouritsen
- Starring: Dorian Brown; Tyler Francavilla; Tamera Mowry; Tommy Dewey; David Weidoff
- Opening theme: "Mess" by his Orchestra
- Country of origin: United States
- Original language: English
- No. of seasons: 1
- No. of episodes: 13

Production
- Camera setup: Multi-camera setup
- Running time: 21 minutes approx.
- Production companies: Quench; ProdCo Original

Original release
- Network: ABC Family
- Release: March 23 – May 4, 2009

Roommates is an American television sitcom developed by ABC Family and Acme Productions that premiered on March 23, 2009. On April 29, 2009, it was announced that Roommates would not return for a second season.

== Overview ==
The show focuses on a group of twentysomethings who move in together after college. The show is ABC Family’s first scripted half-hour comedy.

The series follows five very different characters and their struggles through life. The main focus of the show revolves around Mark, a struggling actor, who thinks his dream has come true when he runs into high school crush Katie and finds she is looking for a new roommate. Mark takes the chance, moves in, and starts to find a way to win her heart. Katie, who is completely oblivious to Mark's motives, has a hard time getting over her previous boyfriend, Ben, and looks to Mark for support.

The other two roommates, Hope and James, both have their own problems. Hope is longing for an upscale job after losing her job at the television studio, and James brings in a slapstick sensibility as he takes a delight in watching Mark's attempts to "woo" Katie. The series also includes Thom, Mark's ex-roommate, who feels he is destined to help Mark in his quest to be a unit with Katie.

== Cast and characters ==
=== Main ===
- Tyler Francavilla as Mark Fletcher
- Dorian Brown as Katie Bowman
- Tamera Mowry as Hope Daniels
- Tommy Dewey as James
- David Weidoff as Thom

=== Recurring and special appearances ===
- Tim Reid as Mr. Stanley Daniels
- Yara Brighton as Alex the Barista
- Tony Yalda as Winston
- Marilu Henner as James' mother
- Felicia Day as Alyssa

== Episodes ==
Each episode began with the title "The" similar to Seinfeld. Only thirteen episodes of the series were aired before it was cancelled.

No.	Title	Directed by	Written by	Original release date
1	"The Roommate"	Andrew D. Weyman	Robin French, Matt Green & Kieron Quirke	March 23, 2009
Mark gets the chance he has been waiting for when he moves in with his high school crush Katie.
2	"The Tarot"	Andrew D. Weyman	Robin French & Kieron Quirke	March 30, 2009
Katie goes to see someone who reads tarot cards, and finds out that she has already met the man of her dreams.
3	"The Lie"	Andrew D. Weyman	Chris Case	April 6, 2009
Hope persuades Mark and Tom into hiding her secret from Katie about her job.
4	"The Break In"	Ellen Gittelsohn	Eric Siegel & Eric D. Wasserman	April 13, 2009
When Hope's father comes in a surprise visit, he realizes that his daughter's life is a mess, and wants her to move back home. Hope, trying to prove that her life is not that bad, and asks Mark to pretend to be her boyfriend. Can Mark help Hope with another one of her lies or will she be on her way home with her father? Special Guest star: Tim Reid as Mr. Stanley Daniels. NOTE: This is the second time that Tim Reid and Tamera Mowry played father and daughter, the first time being on Sister, Sister.
5	"The Set-Up"	Jack Kenny	Robin French & Kieron Quirke	April 20, 2009
Mark goes on a date with Katie's friend from their law firm.
6	"The Mark-A-Like"	Jack Kenny	Jana Hunter & Mitch Hunter	April 27, 2009
Katie dates a guy that looks like Mark and is more confident and more successful.
7	"The Uninvited Thom"	Jack Kenny	Robin French & Kieron Quirke	April 27, 2009
Things go awry when Mark tries to get Hope a job with his new boss.
8	"The Green People"	Jack Kenny	Jana Hunter & Mitch Hunter	April 27, 2009
Katie needs Mark's help after she steals Hope's business idea and is praised as a genius.
9	"The Game Night"	Jack Kenny	Chris Case & Samantha Montgomery McIntyre	April 27, 2009
Mark finally gets what he wants during game night at the apartment.
10	"The Tickets"	Leslie Kolins Small	Story by : Chris Case; Teleplay by : Jana Hunter & Mitch Hunter	May 4, 2009
Mark buys Katie theater tickets in hope of wooing her away from David.
11	"The Mother of James"	Jack Kenny	Victor Levin	May 4, 2009
James mother comes and visits because she has her first date since the divorce. Special guest star: Marilu Henner
12	"The Trash 'N Treasures"	Jack Kenny	Story by : Chris Case; Teleplay by : Jana Hunter & Mitch Hunter	May 4, 2009
Ben Katie's ex invites her to the trash and treasure party so the whole gang decides to go and something happens between Hope and James
13	"The Old and the New"	Jack Kenny	Story by : Chris Case; Teleplay by : Jana Hunter & Mitch Hunter	May 4, 2009
Things start to heat up between Katie and Mark, but then there is David and Jackie and things get really complicated. Lots more goes on between James and Hope, and they try to conceal it from Mark and Katie. Mark gets the chance he's been waiting for since High School, and turns out to be really nervous about it.

== Response ==
=== Ratings ===
Episode #	Viewers	Demo (18-49)
1	1,504,000	0.4/1
2	444,000	0.2/0
3	N/A	N/A
4	453,000	0.2/0
5	520,000	0.2/1
6	Avg. 315,000	N/A
7	Avg. 315,000	N/A
8	Avg. 315,000	N/A
9	Avg. 315,000	N/A
10	N/A	N/A
11	N/A	N/A
12	N/A	N/A
13	N/A	N/A

- Episode 1 followed the season finale of The Secret Life of the American Teenager, which had 4.49 million viewers.
- Episode 2 followed the season premiere of Greek, which had 991,000 viewers.

=== Series cancellation ===
ABC Family canceled Roommates after only six episodes. Roommates was an attempt by ABC Family to push towards an older audience by stepping out of the teen demographic. Star Tamera Mowry told TV.com that "the tone was more along the lines of ABC Family's hit Greek, which targets older teens and younger adults."
