= Tasha Scott =

American actress and singer

Tasha Scott is an American actress and singer.

Scott acted in several productions in the 1980s and 1990s. She appeared in a number of television shows, including Snoops, South Central and The Parent 'Hood, and in movies such as Troop Beverly Hills, Kiss Shot and Camp Cucamonga. She also played the role of Dorothy in the US national tour of the musical The Wiz from 1996 to 1997. She also played Effy in Season 3, Episode 12 of Quantum Leap.
