= Once Upon a Time... When We Were Colored =

- DVD cover
- Directed by: Tim Reid
- Screenplay by: Paul W. Cooper
- Based on: Once Upon a Time When We Were Colored by Clifton Taulbert
- Produced by: Michael Bennett; Tim Reid
- Starring: Al Freeman Jr.; Phylicia Rashad; Leon
- Narrated by: Phill Lewis
- Cinematography: John Simmons
- Edited by: David Pincus
- Music by: Paul Buckmaster; Lionel Cole; Steve Tyrell
- Production companies: BET Pictures; United Image Entertainment
- Distributed by: Legacy Releasing Corporation
- Release date: January 26, 1996 (United States)
- Running time: 115 minutes
- Country: United States
- Language: English
- Box office: $2.9 million

Once Upon a Time... When We Were Colored is a 1996 American period drama film directed by Tim Reid and starring Al Freeman Jr., Phylicia Rashad and Leon. The screenplay was written by Paul W. Cooper. The film is based on Clifton Taulbert’s real life and his non-fiction book Once Upon a Time When We Were Colored.

== Plot ==
The film takes place in Glen Allan, Mississippi, during the mid-20th century. In the early stages of the film, the audience gains more knowledge regarding Cliff's upbringing. His biological mother was too young to take care of him and was not able to provide Cliff with financial support therefore he was raised by his extended family. Ma Pearl and Poppa begin to take care of him but after a couple of years, Ma Ponk begins to take care of Cliff and ultimately raises him, with the help of Poppa.

Ma Ponk, Poppa, and Cliff are the three main characters in the film. Another scene that occurs early on in the film which helps to portray the racial climate during the 1950s in the South, is when Cliff and Poppa attend a parade hosted by the Ku Klux Klan and are confronted for being African Americans by a violent Ku Klux Klan member. As the film progresses, it is known that Cliff lives in a low-income, rural place where almost every adult is a laborer, most commonly a field worker. This is known when the narrator mentions that Cliff attends school in a single bungalow where his classmates are the children of servants, illiterate farm workers, poor field workers, and maids. Even his caregiver, Ma Ponk works in a cotton field picking cotton for a white farmer.

Also, the majority of the people living in this small town are part of a Christian church where at times they come together and unite to stay strong against the social injustices placed upon them. Ma Ponk is religious and is an active participant in her local Christian church. As she is a faithful member, she attends meeting regularly and is part of the church's gospel choir. As the film progresses even more, the audience has the chance to see Cliff grow up into a hard-working young man with positive aspirations of becoming more educated. Cliff begins working for an older white woman, Ms. Mavory, who begins to show an interest in educating and enlightening Cliff. She asks him if he likes to read and he says yes therefore she then begins to make trips to the local library and checks out books for Cliff to read, which he otherwise would not have access to.

One book that she checks out for Cliff is Homer's Iliad. Cliff reads it and mentions to Cleve that he actually enjoys reading the book. The fact that Cliff enjoys reading great classics and strives to excel in school shows that he does want to make a positive change in himself and in society. He does not make a radical change but instead makes a subtle positive change by choosing to work hard and continue his education. When Cliff grows older and finishes his high school education, he leaves his hometown to migrate North. He leaves the South in hope of finding a better life and reaching his dreams.

== Cast ==
- Al Freeman Jr. as Poppa
- Phylicia Rashad as Ma Ponk
- Leon as Uncle Melvin
- Paula Kelly as Ma Pearl
- Charles Earl Taylor Jr. as Cliff (5 Yrs.)
- Salli Richardson as Miss Alice
- Anna Maria Horsford as Miss Annie
- Bernie Casey as Mr. Walter
- Isaac Hayes as Preacher Hurn
- Willie Norwood Jr. as Cliff (12 Yrs.)
- Karen Malina White as Mary
- Damon Hines as Cliff at 16
- Taj Mahal as Mr. Will
- Iona Morris as Nila Fontaine
- Phill Lewis as Sammy (19 Yrs.) / Narrator
- Polly Bergen as Miss Maybry
- Richard Roundtree as Cleve
- Crystal R. Fox as Miss Doll
- Daphne Maxwell Reid as Miss Maxey

== Reception ==
On review aggregator website Rotten Tomatoes, the film holds an approval rating of 71% based on 14 reviews. Roger Ebert gave the movie four stars of four. Eleanor Ringel of the Atlanta Journal-Constitution called it a "fine new film" that "pays tribute to a generation of African-Americans who never got a break coming or going" and described Reid as "a graciously unobtrusive director." Kevin Thomas of the Los Angeles Times also commented favorably on the film, calling it "a beautifully wrought film in all its aspects [that] glows with an array of beautiful, selfless performances." David Hinckley of the Daily News in New York said that "The pace of 'Once Upon a Time' is deliberate, like a Southern summer, and its direction conservative, making it resemble at times a good TV movie. It even echoes, a bit, the fine TV series 'I'll Fly Away'—except this time, it tells the black story from the black point of view, filled out to be warm, rich and human." Stephen Holden of The New York Times described the film as "an unabashedly nostalgic portrait of the black rural South. For all the hard times and the continuous threat of lynching faced by the movie's working-class characters, many of whom have spent their lives picking cotton, they compose a remarkably cohesive and vital community." Joanna Connors of The Plain Dealer called it "a beautifully crafted film" that "gently and quite persuasively reminds us that nothing the past is as simple as we think, not even the bitterness of segregation, and suggests, too, that maybe something small but special was lost amid the towering gains of the civil rights era." Terry Lawson of the Detroit Free Press remarked:

"Once Upon a Time. When We Were Colored" is no fairy tale, but despite its depictions of a sinister Ku Klux Klan and the ugliness of Jim Crow laws, it still manages to make the Mississippi Delta of the late 1940s and '50s look like a pretty good place for a black American to grow up. This is not, the movie makes clear, because of the conditions, but because of the people who refused to let those conditions beat them down.
In fact, "Don't let them beat you down" could be this gentle, affecting movie's mantra.

Gary Thompson of the Philadelphia Daily News called it "a warm, pastoral picture that would seem utterly commonplace were it not so uncommon in the context of movies for African-Americans." Bob Fenster of The Arizona Republic gave the film four stars and said that Reid "shows social conscience and talent as a filmmaker: choosing a large, intricate story for his first film." Harper Barnes of the St. Louis Post-Dispatch said that it "powerfully and truthfully evokes what it was like, 40 or 50 years ago, to grow up in a small town in the South." Stephen Hunter of The Baltimore Sun added that "Reid, working from a screenplay by Paul W. Cooper, never preaches, hectors or lectures, but he makes his point. This isn't an atrocity exhibition, but more an examination of the subtleties of discrimination." Jeff Strickler of the Star-Tribune gave the film a four-star rating, and described it as "a film that is as low-key as a neighborhood stroll on a warm summer evening. And every bit as pleasant." Tony Norman of the Pittsburgh Post-Gazette gave the film three-and-a-half stars, and called it "one of the best films to come around this year because of its non-traditional view of blacks as supremely capable of working toward positive solutions to their dilemma." Craig Kopp of The Cincinnati Post said that the movie displayed "unvarnished story-telling that lets the events it recalls carry the message of its time."

In a mixed review, Barry Walters of the San Francisco Examiner said that "it has the small-scale look and episodic pacing of TV, but lacks the sustained intensity that makes a movie work without the commercial (and bathroom) breaks." In another mixed review, Mick LaSalle of the San Francisco Chronicle described it as "an intelligent, sincere film that's unfortunately torpedoed by a lack of narrative drive"; he also said that "director Tim Reid gets strong performances from his cast" but that "the slow pace Reid adopts ultimately tests the viewer's patience."

At the 1997 NAACP Image Awards film received two nominations: for Outstanding Motion Picture, and Outstanding Actress in a Motion Picture (Phylicia Rashad). It also received American Black Film Festival Award for Best Film.
