= Alley Cats Strike =

1999 television film

- VHS cover
- Genre: Comedy drama; Sports
- Written by: Gregory K. Pincus
- Directed by: Rod Daniel
- Starring: Kyle Schmid; Robert Ri'chard; Kaley Cuoco; Matt McCoy; Tim Reid
- Music by: Bill Elliott
- Countries of origin: United States; Canada
- Original language: English

Production
- Executive producer: Carol Ames
- Producer: Christopher Morgan
- Production locations: Toronto; Woodbridge, Ontario; York, Toronto
- Cinematography: Peter Benison
- Editor: Robert Souders
- Running time: 88 minutes
- Production company: Rastar

Original release
- Network: Disney Channel
- Release: March 18, 2000

Alley Cats Strike (stylised as Alley Cats Strike!) is a 2000 sports comedy-drama television film directed by Rod Daniel, written by Gregory K. Pincus, and starring Kyle Schmid, Robert Ri'chard, and Kaley Cuoco. It premiered as a Disney Channel Original Movie on March 18, 2000.

== Plot ==
A junior high school basketball game between the cities of East Appleton and West Appleton ends in a tie. The two cities, both vying for a trophy known as The Mighty Apple, must determine the winner through a bowling competition. Alex Thompson and his friends, Delia, Elisa and Ken, are in West Appleton Junior High School's bowling club; they discover that Todd McLemore, a popular basketball player, is also a member of the club, as his friends Leo and Flip had signed him up as a prank.

At a bowling alley operated by Alex's father, Kevin Thompson, Todd reluctantly trains for the upcoming bowling competition with Alex and his friends. He criticizes Alex and his friends for not demonstrating a strong willingness to win, which they deem as overconfidence. Alex later attends a party with Todd, rather than train at the bowling alley with his friends, upsetting them. Todd's bowling improves, while Alex's bowling becomes worse as he continues to spend time with Todd.

The children later redecorate Kevin's bowling alley to bring in customers. Todd uses his popularity to convince various businesses to donate supplies such as paint and flashing lights for the bowling alley, where a party known as the "Bowling Ball" is held and attended by dozens of people. Delia, Elisa, and Ken leave the party early, as they feel betrayed by Alex now frequently hanging out with Todd and his friends. After the party, Alex overhears Todd's friends talking among each other and discovers that they are only pretending to be friends with Alex to increase the chances of their school winning back The Mighty Apple.

Jeff McLemore, Todd's father and the mayor of West Appleton, makes a wager with mayor Hanburger of East Appleton: the winning team, in addition to receiving The Mighty Apple, will also get to choose the name for a new school that is under construction. Hanburger hires Whipsaw McGraw, a bowling champion, to train his bowling team. From the city, the West Appleton bowling team receives low-quality team shirts for the bowling competition. The team is also told about the wager between the mayors, after which Alex quits the team out of anger.

Todd attempts to convince Alex to rejoin the bowling team, and reveals new shirts with the team's name, Alley Cats, on it. Kevin later tells Alex that he used to be friends with Jeff when they were younger, but ended their friendship after accusing the other of losing a baseball game, which they both believe resulted in the city losing The Mighty Apple. Kevin tells Alex to not let a dispute end a friendship.

Alex rejoins the bowling team for the competition the next day. At the end of the competition, Todd's bowling results in a 7–10 split, which he could never master during his training. Delia substitutes for Todd. Using her knowledge of physics, Delia rolls a spinner slowly down the lane and spares, winning the competition, to everyone's surprise. Todd tells his father that it does not seem fair for a school to be named over a game of bowling. Alex and his friends decide to compromise and name the new school Appleton Central.

== Cast ==
- Kyle Schmid as Alex Thompson, the co-leader of Alley Cats
- Robert Ri'chard as Todd McLemore, the leader of Alley Cats
- Kaley Cuoco as Elisa Bowers, the member of Alley Cats
- Matt McCoy as Mr. Kevin Thompson, Alex's father
- Tim Reid as Mayor Jeff McLemore, Todd's father
- Joey Wilcots as Ken Long, the member of Alley Cats
- Mimi Paley as Delia Graci, the member of Alley Cats
- Philip Williams as Louis "Sweet Lou"
- Hardee T. Lineham as Principal Morris
- Evan Noble as Leonardo "Leo", Todd's friend
- Gino Giacomini as "Flip", Todd's other friend
- Daphne Maxwell Reid as Mrs. Cathy McLemore, Todd's mother
- Rodger Barton as Mayor Hanburger
- Roman Podhora as Coach Fetters
- David Reale as Baron McKay
- Laura Vandervoort as Lauren
- Joan Gregson as Ms. Jenson
- Janet Bailey as Nancy
- Alisha Morrison as Gina
- Marcello Meleca as Bubba
- Bill Lake as "Whipsaw" McGraw
- Booth Stephenson as Bobby Nagurski
- David Talbot as Corning
- Mary Lu Zahalan as Ms. Johnson
- Paul Constable as Bowling Referee
- Rufus Crawford as Ken's Dad
- Elizabeth Lennie as Mrs. Thompson, Alex's mother
- Terry Doyle as Grandpa, Alex's maternal grandfather

== Production ==
Filming of Alley Cats Strike began on October 25, 1999.

== In popular culture ==
In 2014, the film's English Wikipedia article gained attention in Slate for having the longest film plot summary on the English-language version of the site.

== Soundtrack ==
No.	Title	Lyrics	Music	Length
1.	"Pedal to the Steel"	Chris Browne, Shaffer Smith, Wade Robson, Kenny Blank, and Kel Mitchell	Youngstown
2.	"Just Allow"	Norwood Fisher	Fishbone and The Familyhood Nextperience
3.	"Body Rockin' Time"	Douglas Shawe, Tom Mgrdichian, and Teddy Castellucci	Christian Davis
4.	"Anywhere You Are"	Tom Snow and Jack Feldman	Chan Andre
5.	"Pitiful"	Jim Cushnie, Ricky Estrada, David Ferreria, Richard Ferreira and Dennis Leipert	Pushover
6.	"Hey Louise"	Matt Leonard	Squirtgun
7.	"Camp Hollywood Special"	Bill Elliott	The Bill Elliott Swing Orchestra
8.	"When We Dance"	Bill Elliott	The Bill Elliott Swing Orchestra
9.	"The Shim Sham Song"	Bill Elliott	The Bill Elliott Swing Orchestra
10.	"Let's Get Married"	Bill Elliott	The Bill Elliott Swing Orchestra
11.	"Swinging the Century"	Bill Elliott	The Bill Elliott Swing Orchestra
12.	"I'm Fallin' in Love Again"	Bill Elliott	The Bill Elliott Swing Orchestra
13.	"Skiing Moguls"	Phil Marshall	Mersh Bros. Band
14.	"Wind Surfing"	Phil Marshall	Mersh Bros. Band

== See also ==
- List of basketball films
