= Tim Reid =

American actor and film director (born 1944)

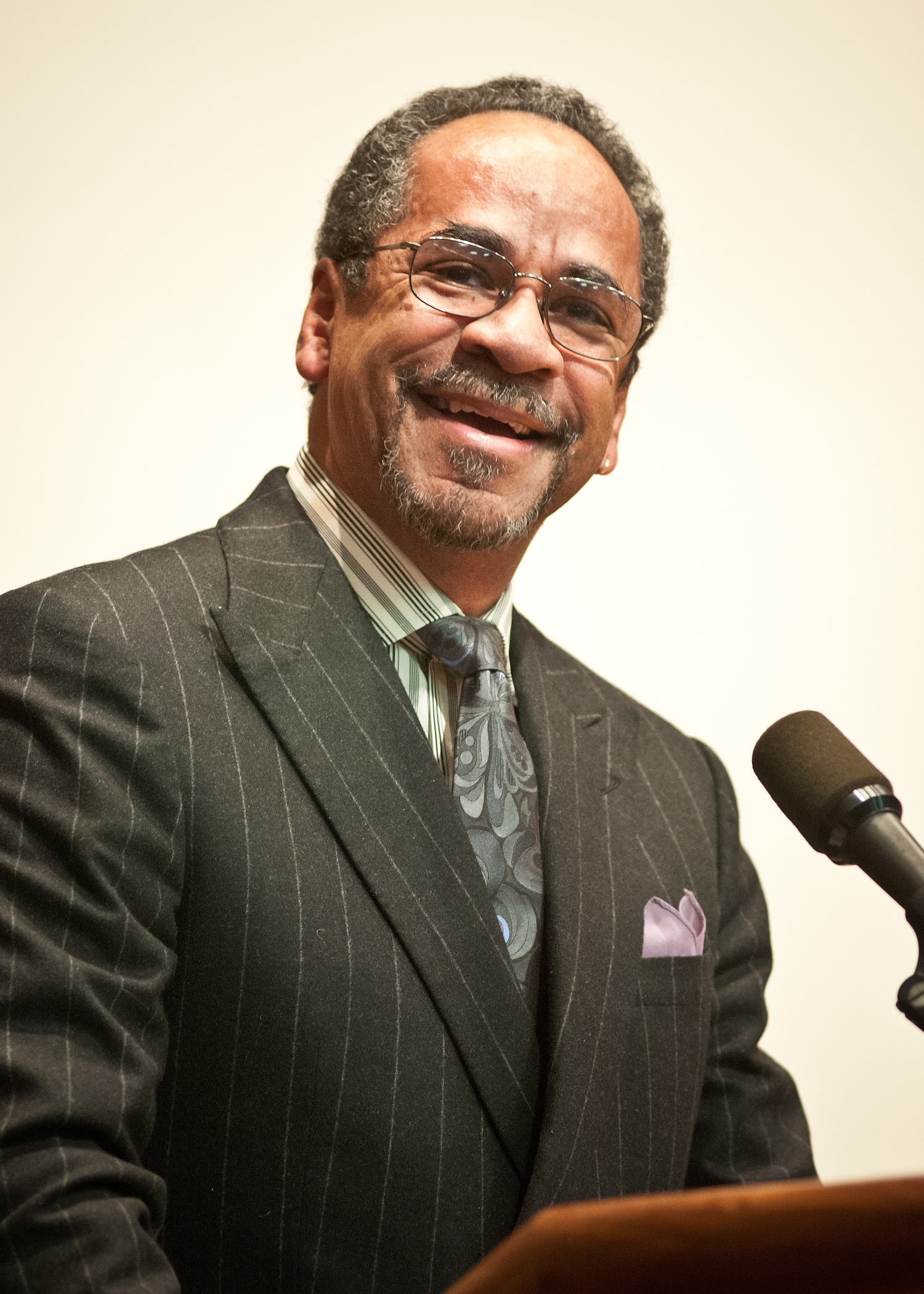
- Reid in 2012
- Born: Timothy Lee Reid Sr. December 19, 1944 (age 81); Norfolk, Virginia, U.S.
- Education: Norfolk State University (BBA)
- Occupations: Actor; comedian; director
- Years active: 1968–present
- Known for: WKRP in Cincinnati; Simon & Simon; Sister, Sister; That '70s Show
- Spouses: Rita Sykes (m. 1966; div. 1980); Daphne Maxwell (m. 1982)
- Children: 2

Timothy Lee Reid Sr. (born December 19, 1944) is an American actor, comedian and film director best known for his roles in prime time American television programs, such as Venus Flytrap on WKRP in Cincinnati (1978–82), Marcel "Downtown" Brown on Simon & Simon (1983–87), Ray Campbell on Sister, Sister (1994–99) and William Barnett on That '70s Show (2004–06).

Reid also starred in a CBS series, Frank's Place, as a professor who inherits a Louisiana restaurant. Reid is the founder and president of Legacy Media Institute, a non-profit organization "dedicated to bringing together leading professionals in the film and television industry, outstanding actors, and young men and women who wish to pursue a career in the entertainment media".

== Early years ==
Reid was born in Norfolk, Virginia, and raised in the Crestwood area of Chesapeake, formerly Norfolk County, Virginia. He is the son of William Lee and Augustine (née Wilkins) Reid. He had experienced segregation growing up in Norfolk, the majority of businesses around him being black-owned. He earned his Bachelor of Business Administration degree at Norfolk State College in 1968. Reid also became a member of Alpha Phi Alpha fraternity. After graduation, he was hired by Dupont Corporation, where he worked for three years.

Reid's entertainment career also began in 1968. He and insurance salesman Tom Dreesen met at a Junior Chamber of Commerce meeting near Chicago. They were "put together to promote an anti-drug program in the local schools" and, prompted by a comment from a child, decided to form a comedy team. The team, later billed as "Tim and Tom", was the first interracial comedy duo. Years later, Reid and Dreesen wrote a book about those years called Tim & Tom: An American Comedy in Black and White (2008), co-written with sports writer Ron Rapoport.

== Television acting career ==
Reid started out on the short-lived The Richard Pryor Show in 1977. Reid starred as DJ Gordon "Venus Flytrap" Sims on the hit CBS sitcom WKRP in Cincinnati from 1978-1982, in what is perhaps his best known TV role. He reprised his role in a 1992 episode of the sequel series The New WKRP in Cincinnati.

Reid starred as Lieutenant Marcel Proust "Downtown" Brown on the CBS detective series Simon & Simon from 1983-1987. In 1988, Reid won an award from Viewers for Quality Television Awards as "Best Actor in a Quality Comedy Series" in CBS comedy Frank's Place (1987-1988). In 1988, the same role earned him an Image Award for "Outstanding Lead Actor in a Comedy Series", but the series was short-lived as was his subsequent CBS series Snoops (1989-1990).

Reid played the adult Mike Hanlon in the 1990 television mini-series adaptation of Stephen King's epic horror novel It. He made an appearance as Sgt. Ray Bennett of the Seacouver Police Department in three first-season episodes of Highlander: The Series from 1992-1993. Reid had a starring role in the series Sister, Sister as Ray Campbell for the entire six-season run from 1994–1999. On April 13, 2009, he appeared opposite former Sister, Sister co-star Tamera Mowry on the short-lived ABC Family series Roommates as Mr. Daniels. Reid had a recurring role on That '70s Show as William Barnett from 2004 to 2006.

== Directing ==
Reid has directed various television programs, as well the 1996 film Once Upon a Time...When We Were Colored, based on a similarly titled memoir by Clifton L. Taulbert. Reid directed and adapted a children's TV show called Bobobobs that aired in the late 1980s. He is the creator of Stop the Madness, an after-school special video in the fight against drugs, recorded on December 11, 1985.

== New Millennium Studios ==
Tim and Daphne Maxwell Reid built New Millennium Studios in 1997. Located in Petersburg, Virginia, the 57.4-acre site with its 14,850-square-foot sound studio was both the only Black-owned film studio in the United States since the 1930s, and also one of the largest independent film studios outside of Hollywood.

New Millennium Studios was used in dozens of movie and television productions, including scenes from the 2001 film Hearts in Atlantis of the Stephen King book of the same name; parts of 2000's The Contender and elements of Steven Spielberg's 2012 film Lincoln were all shot there. The Reids also produced feature films of their own.

Due to "a lack of incentives in the state" to bring film production to Virginia, the Reids sold the property in March 2015 for $1.475 million to Four Square Property Management LLC, a company formed by Four Square Industrial Constructors, based in Chester, Virginia.

== Personal life ==
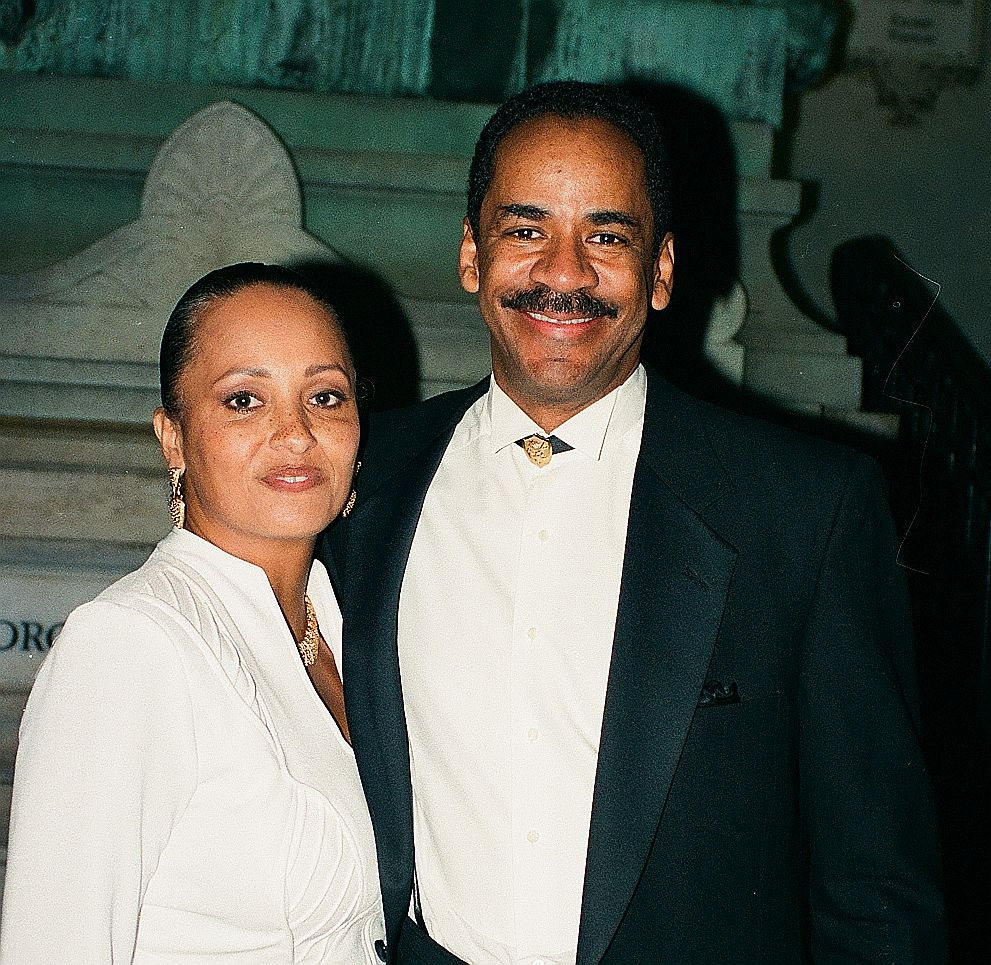
Daphne and Tim Reid in 1997

In 1966, Reid married Rita Ann Sykes; they divorced on May 9, 1980. They have two children together: Timothy II (born 1968) and Tori Reid (born 1971). On December 4, 1982, he married actress Daphne Maxwell Reid.

In July 2011, Reid was named to the board of directors of the American Civil War Center at Tredegar Iron Works. On May 10, 2014, Reid received a Virginia Commonwealth University honorary doctorate for his many outstanding and distinguished contributions after he delivered a commencement speech.

During the 1980s and 1990s, Reid served on the advisory board of the National Student Film Institute. A native Virginian, Reid resides in Glenshellah, Portsmouth, Virginia.

== Filmography ==
Year	Film	Role	Notes
1974	That's My Mama	Rev. Armbruster	Episode:"Clifton's Persuasion "
1976	Mother, Jugs & Speed	Unity Dispatcher	uncredited
1976	Rhoda	Kitchen Helper	Episode: "Guess Who I Saw Today"
1977	Fernwood 2 Night	Matthew Johnson	Episode: "#1.43"
1977	The Richard Pryor Show	Blind Man	Episode: "#1.2"
1977	Lou Grant	TV Cameraman	Episode: "Hostages"
1977	What's Happening!!	Dr. Claymore	Episode: "It's All in Your Head"
1977	Maude	Policeman	Episode: "Maude's Christmas Surprise"
1978	ABC Weekend Specials	Tillson	Episode: "Little Lulu"
1978–1982	WKRP in Cincinnati	Venus Flytrap	83 episodes
1979	You Can't Take It with You	Donald	TV movie
1982	Benson	Russell DuBois	Episode: "Thy Brother's Keeper"
1983	Teachers Only	Michael Horne	13 episodes
1983–1987	Simon & Simon	Det. Marcel 'Downtown' Brown	79 episodes
1985	Code Name: Foxfire	unknown	Episode: "Robin's Egg Blues"
1987	Matlock	Danny Miller	Episode: "The Court-Martial: Part 1 and 2"
1987–1988	Frank's Place	Frank Parish	22 episodes NAACP Image Award for Outstanding Actor in a Comedy Series; TCA Award for Outstanding Achievement in Comedy (shared with Hugh Wilson); VQT Award for Best Actor in a Quality Comedy Series; Nominated-Golden Globe Award for Best Television Series – Musical or Comedy; Nominated-Primetime Emmy Award for Outstanding Lead Actor in a Comedy Series; Nominated-Primetime Emmy Award for Outstanding Comedy Series
1989	Dead Bang	Chief Dixon	
1989–1990	Snoops	Chance Dennis	13 episodes
1990	The Fourth War	Lt. Col. Clark	
1990	Perry Mason: The Case of the Silenced Singer	Jack Barnett	TV movie
1990	Stephen King's It	Mike Hanlon	TV miniseries
1991	Zorro	Dr. Lorenzo Lozano	Episode: "Wicked, Wicked Zorro"
1992	Just Deserts	Scott Waring	TV pilot episode
1992	The New WKRP in Cincinnati	Venus Flytrap	Episode: "Venus, We Hardly Knew Ya"
1992	Mastergate	Chip Chatworth	TV movie
1992	You Must Remember This	Joe	TV movie
1992–1993	Highlander: The Series	Sgt. Bennett	3 episodes
1993	Say a Little Prayer	Thug	
1994–1999	Sister, Sister	Ray Campbell	114 episodes
1994	Race to Freedom: The Underground Railroad	Frederick Douglass	
1995	Simon & Simon: In Trouble Again	Downtown Brown	TV movie
1995	Out-of-Sync	Det. Wilson	
1996	Once Upon a Time...When We Were Colored	—N/a	Debut as a film director
1997	Touched by an Angel	Buddy Baker	Episode: "Last Call"
1998	Linc's	—N/a	As creator and co-executive producer
2000	Alley Cats Strike	Mayor Jeffery "Jeff" McLemore	Disney Channel Original Movie
2002	Las Vegas Warrior	Doorman 2	
2003	You Wish!	Larry Pendragon	Disney Channel Original Movie
2003	For Real	Mac	Also director
2004–2006	That '70s Show	William Barnett	9 episodes
2005	Preaching to the Choir	Prophet	
2005	The Reading Room	Douglas	TV movie
2006	That's So Raven	Sheriff Jefferson	Episode: "Driving Miss Lazy"
2007	Trade	Hank Jefferson	
2009	Roommates	Mr. Stanley Daniels	Episode: "The Break-In"
2010	The Cost of Heaven	Richard Ginyard	
2010–2012	Treme	Judge John A. Gatling	4 episodes
2012	The Soul Man	Henry	Episode: "Loving Las Vegas"
2013	Troop 491: The Adventures of the Muddy Lions	Pastor Brown	
2013	Habeas Corpus	Ray Senior	Short film
2016	By the Grace of Bob	JJ Barnes	
2016	Limitless	Astrophysicist Sturgeon Reid	Episode: "Close Encounters"
2016	Tri	Miles	
2016	93 Days	Dr. Adeniyi Jones	
2016	Chasing Waterfalls	Quincy	TV movie
2016	The Rooftop Christmas Tree	Dale Landis	TV movie
2016	Crushed	Russell Black	TV movie
2017–2018	Greenleaf	Bishop Lionel Jeffries	5 episodes
2017–2018	Me, Myself & I	Older Darryl	3 episodes
2018	Love Is_	"Wiser" Sean	Episode: "(His) Answers"
2018	My Christmas Inn	Perry Taylor	TV movie
2019	Grey's Anatomy	Julian	Episode: "I Walk the Line"
2019	Radio Christmas	Garrett	TV movie
2019	Dolly Parton's Heartstrings	Kendal Hooks	Episode: "If I Had Wings"
2019	Check Inn to Christmas	Blake	TV movie
2019	Baking Christmas	Phillip	TV movie
2020	A Welcome Home Christmas	General O'Toole	TV movie
2021	Swagger	Clyde Sawyer	3 episodes
2021	Pennywise: The Story of It	Himself	Documentary film
2022	A New Orleans Noel	Marcel Lirette	TV movie
2024	Stream	Dave Burham	
