= Linc's =

- Created by: Tim Reid; Susan Fales-Hill
- Starring: Steven Williams; Golden Brooks; Joe Inscoe; Georg Stanford Brown; Pam Grier
- Composer: Lionel Cole
- Country of origin: United States
- Original language: English
- No. of seasons: 2
- No. of episodes: 37

Production
- Executive producers: Tim Reid; Susan Fales-Hill
- Running time: 30 minutes
- Production companies: Tim Reid Productions; Viacom Productions

Original release
- Network: Showtime
- Release: August 1, 1998 – February 13, 2000

Linc's is an American comedy-drama created by Tim Reid and Susan Fales-Hill. The series stars Steven Williams, Pam Grier and Golden Brooks, and is set in a bar in Washington, D.C. It aired on Showtime for two seasons from August 1998 to February 2000. After its cancellation, it was briefly syndicated on Showtime's sister network BET.

== Cast ==
=== Main ===
- Steven Williams as Russell A. "Linc" Lincoln, the owner of Linc's Bar & Grill.
- Golden Brooks as CeCe Jennings, a waitress at Linc's and a single mother
- Joe Inscoe as Harlan Hubbard IV, Chief of Staff for the Republican Senator from Mississippi
- Pam Grier as Eleanor Braithwaite Winthrop
- Georg Stanford Brown as Johnnie B. Goode

=== Recurring ===
- Adewale Akinnuoye-Agbaje as Winston Iwelu, a Nigerian cab driver
- Daphne Maxwell Reid as Eartha, a prostitute
- Randy J. Goodwin as Dante Harrison
- Tisha Campbell as Rosalee Lincoln

== Episodes ==
=== Season 1 (1998–99) ===
No. overall	No. in season	Title	Directed by	Written by	Original release date
1	1	"God Don't Like Ugly"	Debbie Allen	Susan Fales-Hill and Tim Reid	August 1, 1998
2	2	"God Don't Like Ugly"	Debbie Allen	Susan Fales-Hill and Tim Reid	August 1, 1998
3	3	"Did He or Didn't He?"	Matthew Diamond	Susan Fales-Hill & Tim Reid	August 8, 1998
4	4	"Why Can't We Be Friends?"	Unknown	Susan Fales-Hill	August 15, 1998
5	5	"A Different Shade of Rashomon"	Alan Myerson	Charles Randolph-Wright	August 22, 1998
6	6	"The Day My Momma Died"	Tim Reid	Adriana Trigiani	August 29, 1998
7	7	"Scratch My Back"	Unknown	Unknown	September 5, 1998
8	8	"Sweet Bitter Love"	James Hampton	Adriana Trigiani	September 12, 1998
9	9	"March on Washington: Part 1"	Tim Reid	Charles Randolph-Wright	September 26, 1998
10	10	"March on Washington: Part 2"	Tim Reid	Charles Randolph-Wright	October 3, 1998
11	11	"Episode #1.9"	Unknown	Unknown	October 17, 1998
12	12	"Winston's Deportation"	Unknown	Unknown	October 24, 1998
13	13	"Gangsta Rap"	James Hampton	Dewayne Wickham	October 31, 1998
14	14	"A Little T.K.O."	James Hampton	Adriana Trigiani	December 19, 1998
15	15	"Lt. Lincoln Goes to Washington"	Unknown	Unknown	January 28, 1999

=== Season 2: 1999–2000 ===
No. overall	No. in season	Title	Directed by	Written by	Original release date
16	1	"Lovers and Other Traitors"	Tim Reid	Susan Fales-Hill	June 13, 1999
17	2	"Trust in Me"	Tim Reid	Susan Fales-Hill	June 20, 1999
18	3	"Moonlighting"	James Hampton	Adriana Trigiani	June 27, 1999
19	4	"Love is War"	Matthew Diamond	Charles Randolph-Wright	July 11, 1999
20	5	"To Slam or Not to Slam"	Unknown	Charles Randolph-Wright	July 18, 1999
21	6	"From Here to Eternity"	Georg Stanford Brown	Adriana Trigiani	July 25, 1999
22	7	"Shades of Gray"	Tim Reid	Adriana Trigiani	August 1, 1999
23	8	"Deconstructing Harlan"	Matthew Diamond	Susan Fales-Hill	August 8, 1999
24	9	"Speaking in Tongues"	Matthew Diamond	Charles Randolph-Wright	August 15, 1999
25	10	"Secrets and Lies and the Missing Modigliani"	Unknown	Unknown	August 22, 1999
26	11	"The Coliseum"	Unknown	Unknown	August 29, 1999
27	12	"Like Father Like Daughter"	Unknown	Unknown	September 5, 1999
28	13	"On the Air"	Unknown	Unknown	September 12, 1999
29	14	"15 Seconds of Fame"	Tim Reid	Susan Fales-Hill	December 5, 1999
30	15	"What I Did for Love"	Unknown	Unknown	December 12, 1999
31	16	"Real Time"	Unknown	Unknown	December 19, 1999
32	17	"Dog Day Afternoon"	James Hampton	Story by : Tim Reid; Teleplay by : Charles Randolph-Wright & Susan Fales-Hill & Adriana Trigiani	December 26, 1999
33	18	"A Dry White Season"	Unknown	Susan Fales-Hill & Charles Randolph-Wright	January 16, 2000
34	19	"The Music in Me"	Unknown	Unknown	January 23, 2000
35	20	"I Just Want to Testify"	Bob Delegall	Story by : Pam Grier; Teleplay by : Susan Fales-Hill & Adriana Trigiani & Charles Randolph-Wright	January 30, 2000
36	21	"East Meets West"	Unknown	Unknown	February 6, 2000
37	22	"People Like Us"	Unknown	Unknown	February 13, 2000

== Production ==
Linc's was the first television series to be filmed at Tim Reid's New Millennium Studios in Petersburg, Virginia. Filming for the first season took place from May to August 1998.

== Awards ==
- In 1999, Linc's was nominated for a GLAAD Media Award for Outstanding TV Drama Series, and Pam Grier was nominated for an NAACP Image Award for Outstanding Lead Actress in a Comedy Series for her role as Eleanor Braithwaite Winthrop.
- In 2000, at the NAACP Image Awards, Linc's was nominated for Outstanding Comedy Series, Pam Grier was nominated for Outstanding Actress in a Comedy Series, and Steven Williams was nominated for Outstanding Actor in a Comedy Series.
