= Mr. Nice Guy (1987 film) =

1987 film

- Directed by: Henry Wolfond
- Written by: Mark Breslin; Henry Wolfond
- Starring: Mike MacDonald; Jan Smithers
- Music by: Paul Hoffert
- Production companies: Shapiro Entertainment; Wolf Film Corporation
- Distributed by: Aliance Studios
- Release date: 1987
- Country: Canada

Mr. Nice Guy was a 1987 Canadian film starring Mike MacDonald and Jan Smithers. It is a mafia-themed comedy.

== Plot ==
A mafia hitman is engaged to be married and his fiancée doesn't know his true profession while his future father-in-law has a contract out on him.

== Cast ==
- Mike MacDonald as Kurt Murdoch
- Jan Smithers as Lise
- Joe Silver as Leser Tish
- Harvey Atkin as Jerry Reeman
- Howard Jerome as The Den
- Keith Knight as Larry
- Lou Pitoscia as Kurt's Chauffeur
- Dan MacDonald as Clemens
- Micheal Donaghue as Catso
- Jack Newman as Salesman
- Maxine Miller as Lise's Mom
- Lillian Lewis as Tish's Receptionist
- Barbara Franklin as Tish's Wife
- Daniel Dicks as Tish's Grandson
- Aino Pirskanen as Kurt's Mom
- Jack Anthony as Kurt's Dad
- Bobbi Sherron as Clinic Receptionist
- Patrick Rose as Senator George Bigger
- Leonard Smofsky as Ray Marris
- Dick Grant as Prison Warden
- Dinah Mate as Catso's Mistress
- Dick Callahan as M.C.
- Pat Kelly as Mafia Goon #1
- Mike Kelly as Mafia Goon #2
