= Know Your History: Jesus Is Black; So Was Cleopatra =

- Directed by: Bart Phillips
- Written by: Paul Mooney
- Produced by: Bart Phillips; Malik Levy; Shane Mooney; Mary Pelloni; Adrian Sosebee; D'Angela Steed; Shawn Ullman
- Starring: Paul Mooney
- Production companies: QDIII Entertainment; Momentum; The Roster; Sunseekers Film
- Distributed by: Image Entertainment
- Release date: February 3, 2007
- Running time: 83 minutes
- Country: United States
- Language: English

Know Your History: Jesus Is Black; So Was Cleopatra, is a 2007 stand-up comedy film starring comedian Paul Mooney and directed by Bart Phillips.

The show was filmed at the Laugh Factory before a live audience.
