= Mary Pelloni =

Television producer

Mary Pelloni is an American television producer, director and executive producer, based in Los Angeles, California. She is the executive producer of Discovery +, Travel Channel, The Curse of Lizzie Borden and Ghost Loop, BET's Curvy Style, TLC's DC Cupcakes, Niecy Nash's Wedding Bash and Undercover Princes, and is most known for creating the TV format for television hit reality show Bridezillas. In 2014 Pelloni was hired to produce specials and series for Discovery Studios.

== Career ==
Pelloni started her career at 19 years old at WXYZ-TV in Detroit, Michigan. Pelloni produced several talk shows including The Fran Drescher Show on Fox TV and most notably The Roseanne Talk show where she made several television appearances as herself as well as comedy sketches as Monica Lewinsky. She was the executive producer of Bridezillas and Secret Princes.

Pelloni's roles in the television industry have included Executive Producer, Showrunner, Director, and Development Executive. Her work spans reality shows, talk shows, red carpet events, live shows, comedy shows, judge shows, docuseries, and documentaries. She has collaborated with notable figures such as Oprah Winfrey, Queen Latifah, Dave Chappelle, Niecy Nash, Roseanne Barr, Joan Rivers, Sally Jessy Raphael, Fran Drescher, DaBaby, Zara Larsson, Shakira, Le Sserafim, Jenny McCarthy, Yo-Yo and media companies Billboard Media, IndieWire and The Hollywood Reporter. Pelloni was the manager and producing partner of choreographer JaQuel Knight.

Pelloni was the director and executive producer of Paul Mooney's comedy show and stand up, and is credited with helping write Mooney's book, Black is the New White.

Pelloni received a Gold Telly Award for Best Horror TV Shock Doc Documentary, The Curse of Lizzie Borden.

In 2019, Pelloni was named showrunner for The Hollywood Reporter.

Most recently, Pelloni was recognized as the first to legally copyright commercial choreography with the Copyright Office and establish licensing deals with Epic Games and championing choreographers to legal own their dance moves. Pelloni is an executive producer of the film, Own The 8 Count, about the issues of copyrights and choreographers receiving appropriate credit for their work.

October 2025 saw IndieWire Executive Producer Mary Pelloni nominated for two National Arts and Entertainment Journalism Awards. Pelloni was nominated in the Multimedia Package category for “Career Blueprint: It All Led to ‘Dune,’” an in-depth look at Denis Villeneuve’s career. Pelloni, Craft Editor Sarah Shachat, and Video Producer Trevor Wallace were nominated and won the One-on-One Interview, TV/Streaming Personalities category for the Stephen Graham interview “Why Netflix’s ‘Adolescence’ Had a ‘No Dicks’ Policy.”

Pelloni will serve as executive producer on the upcoming documentary about the Tupac Shakur murder trial for Pioneer Productions.
