= Eight Habits of the Heart =

1997 memoir by Clifton Taulbert

Eight Habits of the Heart: Embracing the Values That Build Strong Communities
- Author: Clifton Taulbert
- Language: English
- Genre: Memoir
- Publisher: Penguin
- Publication date: 1997
- Publication place: United States
- Pages: 135
- ISBN: 0-14-026676-3
- OCLC: 40593222

Eight Habits of the Heart: Embracing the Values That Build Strong Communities is a memoir by Clifton Taulbert, first published in 1997.

It recounts the eight lessons that he learned while growing up in the Mississippi Delta, United States, lessons he attributes to the "front porch wisdom" of the people in his community. He claims that these eight habits are "timeless and universal" and are not "held captive by race, gender, or geography."
