= Mike MacDonald (comedian) =

Canadian actor & comedian (1954–2018)

- Born: Michael Allan MacDonald; June 21, 1954; Metz, France
- Died: March 17, 2018 (aged 63); Ottawa, Ontario, Canada
- Notable work: Mike MacDonald; On Target; My House! My Rules! Happy As I Can Be
- Spouse: Bonnie MacDonald

Comedy career
- Years active: 1978–2018
- Medium: Stand-up
- Genres: Satire, observational comedy, blue comedy (early)

Michael Allan MacDonald (June 21, 1954 – March 17, 2018) was a Canadian stand-up comedian and actor. He wrote and appeared in several films, including Mr. Nice Guy. He appeared in such television shows as the Late Show with David Letterman and The Arsenio Hall Show.

== Early life ==
Born in Metz, France, he was the son of a career Royal Canadian Air Force officer. MacDonald spent the first 15 years of his life on military bases throughout France, West Germany and Canada. He learned at an early age that humour would make him popular. When his father retired from the military, his family settled in Ottawa, where MacDonald attended Brookfield High School.

== Career ==
=== Beginnings ===
After high school, MacDonald, who was an accomplished drummer, toured Canada with a rock group sponsored by the Government of Canada. The tour ended and he returned to Ottawa, Ontario. MacDonald spent the next few years in various jobs including drive-in restaurant employee, ballroom dance instructor, and teacher's aide for mentally challenged children. In 1978 at the age of 24, MacDonald began to frequent clubs where he could try his own kind of stand-up comedy.

He moved to Toronto, where he began to perform throughout the city on a regular basis. As his reputation grew, job offers did as well. MacDonald quit his day job so he could make comedy his sole living. He began to perform throughout Canada and made frequent forays into the United States.

=== Standup comedy career ===
MacDonald appeared in successful and well received live performances all over North America and appeared on numerous television shows, including Late Night with David Letterman, The Arsenio Hall Show, Just for Laughs, Showtime's Comedy Club All-Star Show, A&E's An Evening at the Improv, and Comedy Central's The A List.

He hosted both the Gemini Awards and the Just For Laughs 10th Anniversary Special for the CBC. As of 2007, he held the distinction of being the only comedian to perform at each and every Just for Laughs festival.

MacDonald starred in three well received specials for the CBC in Canada and for Showtime in the United States. His first special, Mike MacDonald; On Target was the very first one-hour prime time special by a stand-up comic in the history of the CBC. This success led to MacDonald's next special, My House! My Rules! This special won its prime time slot when it aired in Canada. It also was nominated for two Gemini Awards.

The Showtime version of "My House! My Rules!" was nominated for two CableACE Awards, "Best Comedy Special" and "Best Writing in a Comedy Special". His third Showtime special, called "Happy As I Can Be", was originally slated as a half-hour show. When executives saw the video recording, they immediately expanded it to an hour. "Happy As I Can Be" in its one-hour format also achieved a number one rating when it aired in prime time in Canada on the CBC.

He starred in the short-lived CBC sitcom Mosquito Lake in 1989.

He starred in feature-length documentary The Mike Stand, focusing on his return to comedy post-transplant, which came out in late 2018.

== Personal life ==
MacDonald had bipolar disorder, and he supported the advocacy group Standup for Mental Health.

In 2011, MacDonald was diagnosed with hepatitis C, and he moved back to Ottawa from Glendale, California, where his wife Bonnie was hoping to sell their house.

In April 2012, his illness progressed to the point where his liver and his kidneys failed. He was put on a waiting list for a liver transplant. Friends organized a campaign to collect donations to support MacDonald and to help cover his medical expenses.

On March 17, 2013, MacDonald underwent a successful seven-hour liver transplant operation. He was moved out of the intensive care unit the next day.

He subsequently returned to performing, which he continued until being hospitalized again in March 2018.

== Death ==
MacDonald died of heart complications on March 17, 2018, at the University of Ottawa Heart Institute, at the age of 63.
