= Jan Smithers =

American actress, model and singer (b. 1949)

- Born: Karin Jan Smithers; July 3, 1949 (age 77); North Hollywood, California, U.S.
- Education: Chouinard Art Institute
- Occupations: Actress; singer; model
- Years active: 1966–1987
- Known for: WKRP in Cincinnati
- Spouses: Kipp Whitman (m. 1971; div. 1972); James Brolin (m. 1986; div. 1995)
- Children: 1

Karin Jan Smithers (born July 3, 1949) is an American former actress, model and singer. She is best known for playing Bailey Quarters on the CBS sitcom WKRP in Cincinnati (1978–1982).

== Early life ==
Smithers grew up in a middle-class family in Woodland Hills, Los Angeles. Her father was a lawyer while her mother was a stay-at-home mom. She has three sisters. Her eldest sister, however, died in a car crash at age 21.

Smithers first reached the public eye as a teenager when, at 16, she was profiled and featured on the March 21, 1966 cover of Newsweek. She was seated on the back of a motorcycle. As a result of that appearance Smithers received offers from Hollywood agents.

Smithers graduated from the Taft High School in Woodland Hills, California. She attended the Chouinard Art Institute which is now known as the California Institute of the Arts.

== Career ==
Smithers made her mark as a successful fashion model before embarking on an acting career. She was the co-lead singer of the early 1970s band Hot Cup of Friends which featured Christopher Mancini (the son of Henry Mancini).

Smithers, in her early 20s, won a role in the 1974 feature film, Where the Lilies Bloom, about a household of children surviving in the Appalachian Mountains. In 1978, she got her biggest break, landing a role on the situation comedy, WKRP in Cincinnati, playing Bailey Quarters.

== Personal life ==
Smithers's first marriage was to Kipp Whitman from 1971 to 1972. From 1986 to 1995 she was married to actor James Brolin and was stepmother to his two children from a previous marriage. Together they have one daughter, Molly Elizabeth. Smithers filed for divorce from Brolin in 1995.

After living in Halifax, Nova Scotia, Canada "for a few years", she returned to California. In June 2014, Smithers attended a reunion of surviving WKRP in Cincinnati cast members hosted by the Paley Center for Media.

== Television and filmography ==
| Year | Title | Role | Notes |
|---|---|---|---|
| 1973 | Love Story | Barbara | Episode: "Beginner's Luck" |
| 1974 | Where the Lilies Bloom | Devola | Feature film |
| 1974 | When the North Wind Blows | Lady in the Zoo | Feature film |
| 1976 | Starsky & Hutch | Sharman Crane | Episode: "Running" |
| 1978 | Our Winning Season | Cathy Wakefield | Feature film |
| 1978–82 | WKRP in Cincinnati | Bailey Quarters | Main cast (86 episodes) |
| 1980 | The Love Tapes | Carol Clark | TV movie |
| 1982 | The Love Boat | Sabrina Drake | Episode: "The Spoonmaker Diamond/Papa Doc/The Role Model/Julie's Tycoon" |
| 1983 | The Fall Guy | Cynthia Caldwell | Episode: "Spaced Out" |
| 1983 | The Love Boat | Aurora Adams | Episode: "Long Time No See/The Bear Essence/Kisses and Makeup" |
| 1984 | Legmen | Sarah Turner | Episode: "Take the Credit and Run" |
| 1984 | Hotel | Lacey Grant | Episode: "Encores" |
| 1984 | The Love Boat | Carol Cooperman | Episode: "By Hook or by Crook/Revenge with the Proper Stranger/Don't Get Mad, Get Even" |
| 1984 | Finder of Lost Loves | Barbara Hensen | Episode: "Old Friends" |
| 1985 | Mike Hammer | Shia Walters | Episode: "Firestorm" |
| 1985 | Cover Up | Karen Morris | Episode: "The Assassin" |
| 1985 | Murder, She Wrote | Kathy Farrell | Episode: "Sudden Death" |
| 1985 | Comedy Factory | Barrie Shepherd | Episode: "The Columnist" |
| 1986 | Hotel | Janice Copeland | Episode: "Triangles" |
| 1987 | Mr. Nice Guy | Dr. Lisa Rayon | Feature film |
