= Traffic (broadcasting) =

Scheduling of program material in broadcasting

In broadcasting, traffic is the scheduling of program material, and in particular the advertisements, for the broadcast day. In a commercial radio or TV station there is a vital link between sales (of advertisement or commercial space) and traffic in keeping the information about commercial time availability.

The station sales department sells airtime to its customers. It is not unusual in a single hour for 18–20 minutes to be commercials.

The process begins with the programming department laying out a program schedule. Some programs are pre-recorded and air locally, some come from syndicators or networks. Some programs such as sports, news, and entertainment specials air live as they are happening. The traffic department schedules all of the programs and program elements and merges it into a traffic log.

The traffic department receives orders from the sales department, who sells airtime to advertisers and places those commercials into available airtime slots called commercial breaks ("avails") at the best possible rates. The traffic department generates a daily log of programming elements programs, commercials, features and public service announcements. The log defines when they are scheduled to be aired. The log will be used by the on-air operator who actually plays the commercials. A copy of the log after the fact (sometimes called an AsRun Report) is used for reconciliation to determine what actually aired and then can be sent to accounting to bill the advertisers.

Typically a broadcaster uses a broadcast management software system that allows for automation between departments. Some software systems are end-to-end and manage the whole spectrum of tasks required to broadcast a television or radio station, others specialize in specific areas, such as sales, programming, traffic, or automation for master control.

== Process ==
The traffic process starts by a salesperson making an agreement with a customer about a campaign. The agreement is called a sales order and it defines the dates when spots (advertisements) are run and the commercial terms of the campaign. The sales order usually also defines the product group in order to avoid conflicts in scheduling, for example, where two fast food vendors have a spot in the same break.

At the station, a traffic person collects the sales orders and enters them into a computer system that will help to generate the daily logs. The traffic person also links the sales order with the possible media, such as an audio tape which contains the actual spot. When all the material is finished, the traffic system will be updated with parameters that define how the campaign will be run: in which dayparts there will be spots, how the spots are placed within a break, and what other separation criteria in addition to product groups there may be.
