= Clifton Taulbert =

American author, business consultant, and speaker

- Born: Clifton Lamar Taulbert; 1945 (age 79–80); Glen Allan, Mississippi, U.S.
- Occupation: Author
- Language: English
- Education: O'Bannon High School; Oral Roberts University; Southwest Graduate School of Banking at Southern Methodist University
- Notable works: Once Upon a Time When We Were Colored (1989); Eight Habits of the Heart: Embracing the Values that Build Strong Communities (1997)

Clifton Taulbert (born 1945) is an American author, business consultant, and speaker. He is best known for his books Once Upon a Time When We Were Colored (1989) and Eight Habits of the Heart: Embracing the Values that Build Strong Communities (1997). Taulbert offers courses in Character Education and Building Strong School Communities through Knowledge Delivery Systems, an online resource for educators

Taulbert's book Once Upon a Time When We Were Colored was adapted into the 1996 film Once Upon a Time...When We Were Colored.

== Biography ==
Clifton Lamar Taulbert was born in 1945 in Glen Allan, a small town in the Mississippi Delta. He graduated from O'Bannon High School in Greenville, Mississippi, in 1963 and went on to earn a bachelor's degree from Oral Roberts University and a graduate degree from Southwest Graduate School of Banking at Southern Methodist University. Taulbert served in the 89th Presidential Wing of the United States Air Force and has been inducted in the Enlisted Airmen Hall of Fame.

A former Oklahoma banker, Taulbert is president and founder of the Freemount Corporation, a consulting company focused on human capital development and organizational effectiveness. Since the founding of the company, his philosophy has been embraced by such companies as Lockheed Martin, Bank of America, Baxter Healthcare, Pacific Coast Gas, the U.S. Department of Defense, the U.S. Department of Justice, the Federal Bureau of Investigation and K-12, and post-secondary academic leadership around the world, from China to the Mississippi Delta.

Taulbert was chosen by CNN at the turn of the millennium to represent one of the many voices of community. Taulbert, who has served as a guest professor/lecturer at Harvard University, the University of Virginia Darden School of Business, and the United States Air Force Academy, said he could have failed had it not been for the community of unselfish people who surrounded his life. We should never underestimate the power of our influence on the life of others, according to Taulbert.

Taulbert has authored 13 books, several of which are foundational to his consulting philosophy: Eight Habits of the Heart and Who Owns the Ice House: Eight Life Lessons from an Unlikely Entrepreneur (Who Owns the Ice House is part of a Kauffman Foundation-sponsored education initiative to expose the impact of the entrepreneurial mindset at all levels) and, more recently, Shift Your Thinking: Win Where You Stand and The Invitation: Living beyond the lingering lessons of race and place. Taulbert's Eight Habits has become foundational to his work on leveraging community as an asset in the workplace, and garnered him an invitation to address members of the United States Supreme Court as a personal guest of former Supreme Court justice Sandra Day O’Connor.

Taulbert is a trustee of the University of Tulsa, has been recognized international by the Sales and Marketing Academy of Achievement, the Library of Congress, the NAACP, Rotary International as a Paul Harris Fellow and has been a recipient of the Jewish Humanitarian of the Year Award and the Richard Wright Literary Award. The Freemount Corporation is located in Tulsa, Oklahoma.

He lives in Tulsa, Oklahoma, with his wife Barbara Taulbert.

== Works ==
- Nonfiction
  - Who Owns The Ice House? Eight Life Lessons From An Unlikely Entrepreneur (2010)
  - Once Upon a Time When We Were Colored (1989)
  - The Last Train North (1992)
  - Watching Our Crops Come In (1997)
  - Eight Habits of the Heart: Embracing the Values that Build Strong Communities (1997)
  - The Journey Home: A Father's Gift to His Son (2002)
  - When Little Becomes Much (2005)
  - The Invitation
  - Shift Your Thinking: Win Where You Stand
- Children's books
  - Little Cliff and the Porch People (1999)
  - Little Cliff and the First Day of School (2001)
  - Little Cliff and the Cold Place (2002)
