= Once Upon a Time When We Were Colored =

1989 memoir by Clifton Taulbert

- Author: Clifton Taulbert
- Language: English
- Genre: Memoir
- Published: 1989
- Publication place: United States

Once Upon a Time When We Were Colored is a memoir by Clifton Taulbert, first published in 1989. Taulbert writes about his life experiences from his childhood in a small Mississippi town during the segregated 1950s to his emigration North in 1962 at the age of 17. The book won Taulbert a Pulitzer Prize nomination and was later made into a 1996 movie starring Phylicia Rashad, Richard Roundtree, Isaac Hayes, and Al Freeman, Jr.

== See also ==
- Once Upon a Time...When We Were Colored
