= Helaine Head =

- Born: January 17, 1947 (age 79); Los Angeles, California, U.S.
- Occupations: Film director, television director, theatre director
- Years active: 1982–present

Helaine Head (born January 17, 1947, in Los Angeles, California) is an American film, television, and theatre director.

== Career ==
In television, some of her directing credits are St. Elsewhere, Cagney & Lacey, Frank's Place, L.A. Law, Wiseguy, Tour of Duty, Brewster Place, seaQuest 2032, Law & Order and Sliders. She has also directed a number of television films.

During the 1970s and early 1980s, Head worked as a theatre director and stage manager in a number of stage productions on Broadway. In 1985, Head directed in The Color Purple and Remo Williams: The Adventure Begins.

In 1990, Head directed The Danger Team, a 24-minute claymation special intended to be the pilot episode of a potentially longer running TV show. The pilot aired on ABC on July 3, 1991, and featured claymation mixed with live actors. The pilot episode was poorly received and was not picked up for a full series.

In the 2000s, Head became an associate professor of directing at USC School of Cinematic Arts. Head teaches single camera television as well as intermediate directing and production.

== Movies and television ==
Name	Television/Movie	Year	Role	# of Episodes
The Color Purple	Movie	1985	Music Department	
Remo Williams: The Adventure Begins	Movie	1985	Art Department	
Sidekicks	Television	1986	Director	1
St. Elsewhere	Television	1986-87	Director	3
Maraiah	Television	1987	Director	1
Cagey & Lacey	Television	1986-87	Director	3
Franks Place	Television	1987	Director	1
A Year in the Life	Television	1987-88	Director	2
L.A. Law	Television	1987-88	Director	3
Annie McGuire	Television	1988	Director	1
CBS Schoolbreak Special	Television	1989	Director	1
Heartbeat	Television	1989	Director	1
Wiseguy	Television	1989	Director	1
Island Son	Television	1989	Director	1
Snoops	Television	1989	Director	1
Tour of Duty	Television	1989	Director	2
Brewsters Place	Television	1990	Director	3
Danger Team	Movie	1991	Director	
You Must Remember This	Movie	1992	Director	
American Experience	Television	1993	Director	1
Tribeca	Television	1993	Director	1
Class of '96	Television	1993	Director	2
Jack's Place	Television	1992-93	Director	2
SeaQuest 2032	Television	1993	Director	1
Law & Order	Television	1994	Director	1
A Perry Mason Mystery: The Case of the Lethal Lifestyle	Movie	1994	Director	
Harts of the West	Television	1994	Director	1
Sisters	Television	1994	Director	1
Touched by an Angel	Television	1995	Director	1
The Client	Television	1995-96	Director	2
New York Undercover	Television	1994-96	Director	2
413 Hope St.	Television	1997-98	Director	2
The Net	Television	1998	Director	
Sliders	Television	1998	Director	1
Dear America: A Picture of Freedom	Movie	1999	Director	
After All	Movie	1999	Director	
Dear American: Color Me Dark	Movie	2000	Director	
Soul Food	Television	2000-01	Director	2
