= WKRP in Cincinnati =

American sitcom (1978–1982)

- Genre: Sitcom
- Created by: Hugh Wilson
- Starring: Gary Sandy; Gordon Jump; Loni Anderson; Richard Sanders; Tim Reid; Frank Bonner; Jan Smithers; Howard Hesseman
- Theme music composer: Tom Wells; Hugh Wilson
- Composer: Tom Wells
- Country of origin: United States
- Original language: English
- No. of seasons: 4
- No. of episodes: 90 (list of episodes)

Production
- Executive producer: Hugh Wilson
- Producers: Rod Daniel; Bill Dial; Blake Hunter; Steven Kampmann; Peter Torokvei; Hugh Wilson
- Camera setup: Multi-camera
- Running time: 24–25 minutes
- Production company: MTM Enterprises

Original release
- Network: CBS
- Release: September 18, 1978 – April 21, 1982

Related
- The New WKRP in Cincinnati

Bailey Quarters (Jan Smithers) and Andy Travis (Gary Sandy)

Les Nessman (Richard Sanders) and Dr. Johnny Fever (Howard Hesseman) in the studio

Fever flirts with Jennifer Marlowe (Loni Anderson)

WKRP in Cincinnati is an American sitcom television series about the misadventures of the staff of a struggling fictional AM radio station in Cincinnati, Ohio. The show was created by Hugh Wilson. It was based upon his experiences observing at Top 40 radio station WQXI in Atlanta. Many of the characters were based on people at that station. Wilson selected WKRP as the call sign to stand for C-R-A-P.

The ensemble cast consists of Gary Sandy (as Andy Travis), Howard Hesseman (Dr. Johnny Fever), Gordon Jump (Arthur Carlson), Loni Anderson (Jennifer Marlowe), Tim Reid (Venus Flytrap), Jan Smithers (Bailey Quarters), Richard Sanders (Les Nessman) and Frank Bonner (Herb Tarlek).

The series won a Humanitas Prize and received 10 Emmy Award nominations, including three for Outstanding Comedy Series. Andy Ackerman won an Emmy Award for Videotape Editing in Season 3.

WKRP premiered on September 18, 1978, on the CBS television network and aired for four seasons and 90 episodes, ending on April 21, 1982. Starting in the middle of the second season, CBS repeatedly moved the show around its schedule, contributing to lower ratings and its eventual cancellation. When WKRP went into syndication, it became an unexpected success. For the next decade, it was one of the most popular sitcoms in syndication, outperforming many programs that had been more successful in prime time, including all the other MTM Enterprises sitcoms.

Jump, Sanders, and Bonner reprised their roles as regular characters in a sequel series, The New WKRP in Cincinnati, which ran from 1991 to 1993 in syndication. Hesseman, Reid, and Anderson also reprised their roles as guest stars.

== Premise ==
The station's new program director, Andy Travis, tries to turn around struggling radio station WKRP by switching its format from dated easy-listening music to rock and roll, despite the mostly incompetent efforts of the well-meaning staff: bumbling station manager Arthur Carlson, greasy sales manager Herb Tarlek and clueless news director Les Nessman. To help bolster ratings, Travis hires a new disc jockey, New Orleans native Gordon Sims (with the on-air persona of Venus Flytrap) and allows spaced-out former major-market DJ John Caravella (with the on-air persona of Dr. Johnny Fever), already doing mornings in the easy-listening format, to be himself on-air. Rounding out the cast are "bombshell" receptionist Jennifer Marlowe and junior employee Bailey Quarters. Ruthless business tycoon Lillian Carlson appears periodically as the station's owner and the mother of Arthur Carlson.

== Characters ==
=== Main ensemble ===
- Andy Travis (Gary Sandy). For the most part, vice president and program director Travis serves as the straight man for the eccentric staff of the station he has been hired to run. Before coming to WKRP, he had an unblemished record of turning around failing radio stations, but meets his match in his wacky staff members, of whom he becomes reluctantly fond. The show's opening theme song is about Travis and his decision to settle down in Cincinnati.
- Arthur Carlson (Gordon Jump), is the middle-aged general manager whose main qualification for the job is that his mother, a business tycoon, is the station's owner. His weak, bumbling, and indecisive management style is one of the main reasons the station is unprofitable. Despite this, he is a principled, kind, decent man. He has far more interest in his hobbies than he does in the radio station - often hiding in his office from people who want to see him on business. The employees of the station refer to him as "The Big Guy."
- Dr. Johnny Fever (Howard Hesseman) (real name John R. Caravella) is a veteran disc jockey who comes to WKRP after being fired from a major Los Angeles station when he said "booger" on the air. Cynical and neurotic, Johnny consumes large amounts of coffee and is usually in trouble. He adopts the "Fever" on-air name upon being told by Travis that the station format was changing to Top 40 rock and roll, but he has used other monikers on the air at other stations, mostly to conform to whatever station format he found himself working with.
- Les Nessman (Richard Sanders), the fastidious, bow-tied news reporter, approaches his job with absurdly earnest seriousness, despite being almost totally incompetent (a fact to which he is oblivious). As a running gag, Les wears a bandage in a different spot each episode, presumably due to attacks from his unseen monstrous dog Phil. Other gags are his fixation on agricultural news ("the hog report") and putting masking tape on the floor around his desk, which he insists his co-workers treat as the walls of his "office".
- Jennifer Marlowe (Loni Anderson) is the station's receptionist and highest-paid employee. Not merely "eye candy" for the station, Jennifer is informed, connected, and able to handle practically any situation, no matter how absurd, with aplomb. She herself sees her main job responsibility as deflecting any business calls (in person or over the telephone) for Mr. Carlson. Although very aware of her sex appeal, with various wealthy, powerful older men at her beck and call, she is friendly and good-hearted with the station staff. She is very strict about the limits of her job duties: she does not type letters (though she is in fact an expert typist), and neither makes coffee nor brings any to the office staff.
- Herb Tarlek (Frank Bonner) is the boorish, tasteless, and vain sales manager at WKRP. He often wears loud plaid suits with his belt matching his white shoes. He is unable to land the big accounts, but is effective in selling air time for products such as "Red Wigglers – the Cadillac of worms!" Although a married man with children, he persistently pursues the uninterested Jennifer. Herb is based on radio executive Clarke Brown.
- Venus Flytrap (Tim Reid), the soulful, funky evening DJ, runs his show with a smooth-talking persona and mood lighting in the studio. His real name, Gordon Sims, is almost never used, and he maintains an aura of mystery. After deserting the Army during Vietnam, Venus spent several years as a high school teacher in New Orleans while working part-time as a radio personality. He and Johnny are often seen together and become good friends as the series progresses.
- Bailey Quarters (Jan Smithers), the station ingénue, is originally in charge of billing and station traffic. However, having graduated from journalism school and intent on becoming a broadcast executive, she is later given additional duties in which she proves more capable than Les Nessman. As the series progresses, she overcomes her shyness and develops self-confidence. Jan Smithers was one of two WKRP cast members who was the first choice for the role she played, Gordon Jump being the other. Creator Hugh Wilson said that despite Smithers' lack of experience (she had never acted in a situation comedy before), she was perfect for the character of Bailey as he had conceived her: "Other actresses read better for the part," Wilson recalled, "but they were playing shy. Jan was shy."

=== Recurring characters ===
- Lillian Carlson (Sylvia Sidney in the series pilot, Carol Bruce afterward) is Arthur Carlson's ruthless, domineering mother – often referred to as Mother Carlson (with Arthur calling her Mama) – and the owner of WKRP. An extremely successful and rich businesswoman, her only regret is that her approach to parenting (the "what doesn't kill you, makes you stronger" school of child-rearing) backfired as her son ended up indecisive, weak-willed, and afraid of her. As a display of her cutthroat attitude, she has a painting hanging above her fireplace in her living room of two pairs of dangling legs of people just hanged. In the series' final episode, it is revealed she had always intended WKRP to lose money (for the tax write-off), which explains why she allows the incompetent employees to continue working at the station. The only one who is regularly able to get the better of her is her sarcastic butler, Hirsch. Although she barely tolerated most of the staff, she did have respect for Andy, considering him her intellectual equal.
- Carmen Carlson (Allyn Ann McLerie) is Mr. Carlson's sweet-natured wife. The two met in college, he being her chosen date to a "bring a loser" dance at the sorority she was pledging, something he was unaware of until their twenty-five-year college reunion as they never did go to the dance and she never did pledge that sorority. Though happily married, they are so anxious to avoid hurting each other's feelings that they rarely tell each other what they really think. They have a son, Arthur Carlson Jr. (Sparky Marcus appearing in one episode), whom they've sent off to military school. During the second season Carmen has a surprise pregnancy and during the third season gives birth to a daughter, Melanie.
- Hirsch (Ian Wolfe) is Mother Carlson's "houseboy." He is well into his eighties, but is energetic and seems unfazed by any new circumstances. Hirsch regularly expresses his dislike for his employer in otherwise charming and polite exchanges. His coffee is terrible, unless there is a guest, in which case he prepares it with care.
- Lucille Tarlek (Edie McClurg) is Herb's devoted nasal-voiced wife, who, deep down, knows that he chases after Jennifer. Lucille is perhaps the one woman who does see Herb's charms. Herb and Lucille have an adolescent son and daughter, Herb III and Bunny (N.P. Schoch and Stacy Heather Tolkin, one and two appearances respectively).
- Three other DJs at the station are mentioned, but (with one exception) never seen. Moss Steiger has the graveyard shift after Venus and is mentioned as having attempted suicide at least twice; he eventually dies in The New WKRP in Cincinnati. Rex Erhardt (who was seen in the fourth-season episode "Rumors", and played by Sam Anderson) hosts a program after Dr. Johnny Fever's morning show; and Dean the Dream has the afternoon drive slot. Another DJ, Doug Winter (Philip Charles MacKenzie), is hired and fired in the same episode ("Johnny Comes Back").
- Frank Bartman (Max Wright) is a cynical but practical attorney retained by the station in the fourth season.
- Series writer Bill Dial infrequently appears as Buckey Dornster, WKRP's station engineer.
- Longtime actor William Woodson (though not credited) served as the announcer of the series (imploring the audience to stay tuned for the tag scene, in the episodes that had one) and did various voice-over roles during the run, including the pre-recorded announcer of the intro/outro to Les's newscasts, and the narrator of the trial results in the first-season episode "Hold Up".

Throughout its run WKRP featured appearances by several high-profile guest stars, including Colleen Camp, Sparky Anderson, Hoyt Axton, Michael Des Barres, and Bert Parks, as Herb's dad. Hamilton Camp, Craig T. Nelson, Noble Willingham and Robert Ridgely also appeared in supporting roles.

== Episodes ==
Season	Episodes	Originally released	
Season	Episodes	First released	Last released
1	22	September 18, 1978	June 4, 1979
2	24	September 17, 1979	March 31, 1980
3	22	November 1, 1980	April 12, 1981
4	22	October 7, 1981	April 21, 1982
Special		1980	

== Timeslots and success ==
WKRP in Cincinnati debuted in 1978 in CBS's Monday 8 p.m. timeslot, competing against ABC's Welcome Back, Kotter and NBC's top-20 show Little House on the Prairie. The show initially earned poor ratings, and WKRP was put on hiatus after only eight episodes, even though they included some of the most famous of the series, including "Turkeys Away." But owing to good reviews and positive fan reaction, especially from disc jockeys, who immediately hailed it as the first show that realistically portrayed the radio business, CBS brought WKRP back without any cast changes.

WKRP was given a new timeslot, one of the best on the network, following M*A*S*H. This allowed creator Hugh Wilson to move away from the farcical radio-based stories that CBS wanted and to start telling stories that, while not necessarily dramatic, were more low-key and character-based. To allow the ensemble cast to mingle more, the set was expanded. A previously unseen communal office area ("the bullpen") was added to accommodate scenes with the entire cast.

Partway through the second season, the show was moved back to its original earlier time. CBS executives wanted to free up the prized post-M*A*S*H slot for House Calls (with former M*A*S*H star Wayne Rogers). They also felt that the rock and roll music and the sex appeal of Loni Anderson were better suited to the earlier slot, which was mostly aimed at young people. The mid-season timeslot change did not affect the show's success; WKRP finished at No. 22 in the ratings for its second year. For the next two seasons, the writers and producers often fought with CBS over the show's content in the so-called family hour.

Starting with the second season, CBS moved WKRP around repeatedly, and the show lost nearly 2.5 million viewers on average for each of four timeslot changes in the 1979–80 season.

At the end of the fourth season, the network canceled WKRP. The final first-run episode of WKRP aired on April 21, 1982, and ranked No. 7 in the weekly Nielsen ratings, though the series had already been canceled.

== Production ==
WKRP was videotaped in Hollywood before a live studio audience at KTLA's Goldenwest Videotape Division, later moving to the CBS Studio Center lot in Studio City.

== Awards and nominations ==
Year	Award	Category	Work	Result	Ref.
1979	Golden Globe Awards	Best Supporting Actress – Series, Miniseries or Television Film	Loni Anderson	Nominated	
1980	Golden Globe Awards	Best Actress in a Television Series – Musical or Comedy	Loni Anderson	Nominated	
1981	Golden Globe Awards	Best Actress in a Television Series – Musical or Comedy	Loni Anderson	Nominated	
1981	Humanitas Prize	30 Minute Network or Syndicated Television	Hugh Wilson (for "God Talks to Johnny")	Nominated	
1982	Humanitas Prize	30 Minute Network or Syndicated Television	Hugh Wilson (for "Venus and the Man")	Won	
1980	Primetime Emmy Awards	Outstanding Comedy Series	Hugh Wilson and Rod Daniel	Nominated	
1980	Primetime Emmy Awards	Outstanding Supporting Actor in a Comedy or Variety or Music Series	Howard Hesseman	Nominated	
1980	Primetime Emmy Awards	Outstanding Supporting Actress in a Comedy or Variety or Music Series	Loni Anderson	Nominated	
1981	Primetime Emmy Awards	Outstanding Comedy Series	Hugh Wilson, Rod Daniel, Blake Hunter, Steven Kampmann, and PJ Torokvei	Nominated	
1981	Primetime Emmy Awards	Outstanding Supporting Actor in a Comedy or Variety or Music Series	Howard Hesseman	Nominated	
1981	Primetime Emmy Awards	Outstanding Supporting Actress in a Comedy or Variety or Music Series	Loni Anderson	Nominated	
1981	Primetime Emmy Awards	Outstanding Directing for a Comedy Series	Rod Daniel (for "Venus and the Man")	Nominated	
1981	Primetime Emmy Awards	Outstanding Video Tape Editing for a Series	Andy Ackerman (for "Bah, Humbug")	Won	
1982	Primetime Emmy Awards	Outstanding Comedy Series	Hugh Wilson, Blake Hunter, PJ Torokvei, Dan Guntzelman, and Steve Marshall	Nominated	
1982	Primetime Emmy Awards	Outstanding Video Tape Editing for a Series	Andy Ackerman (for "Fire")	Nominated	
2005	TV Land Awards	Classic TV Broadcaster of the Year	Tim Reid	Nominated	
2006	TV Land Awards	Broadcaster of the Year	Howard Hesseman	Nominated	
2008	TV Land Awards	Broadcaster(s) of the Year	Richard Sanders	Nominated	

== Fact vs. fiction ==
=== "Real" WKRP people ===
While Andy Travis received his name and some personality elements from a cousin of creator Hugh Wilson, he was based primarily on innovative program director Mikel Herrington, who also was the inspiration for the character Jeff Dugan in the 1978 film FM, written by Ezra Sacks, who had worked at KMET. Dr. Johnny Fever was based on a DJ named "Skinny" Bobby Harper at WQXI/790 in Atlanta, Georgia in 1968. WKRP writer Bill Dial worked with Harper at WQXI, which is considered Dial's inspiration for the show. Coincidentally, Harper had previously worked at Cincinnati AM Top 40 powerhouse WSAI in 1964, before moving to 11 other stations, including seven in Atlanta. In 1997, Bobby Harper told WSB's Condace Pressley, "He went on record as pointing out which ones, including myself, that he based the characters on. [That recognition] was a nice little thing. You know? That was nice. I appreciated that." The Carlsons were a pastiche of Jerry Blum, WQXI's longtime general manager. Mrs. Carlson inherited Blum's brashness while Arthur borrowed his nickname "Big Guy," sense of style, and some of his unorthodox promotions (including the turkey drop).

=== Transmission tower ===
Although the show aired on CBS, the self-supporting transmission tower seen at the beginning of WKRP in Cincinnati actually belongs to Cincinnati's NBC affiliate, WLWT.

=== Studios and offices ===
In the show, WKRP's offices and studios are in the Osgood R. Flimm Building, an art deco office building. The building shown during the show's opening credits is actually the Cincinnati Enquirer Building at 617 Vine Street in downtown Cincinnati.

=== Real stations with similar branding ===
Cincinnati has two radio stations with call letters similar to WKRP. WKRC, an AM station that had a "middle of the road" music format when the series debuted, did not object to the use of WKRP, saying that it was the best publicity that they had ever had, and it was free; it currently brands itself (as it did during the show's run) as "55KRC". WKRQ is an FM station with a similar "contemporary hit radio" format; its primary branding is "Q102."

Other stations have adopted similar branding in reference to the series. In 1986, a Salt Lake City FM station (now KUMT) changed its calls letters to KRPN, and branded itself as WKRP, using the similarity of the spoken letter "N" to the word "in" for a sound-alike station identification: "W KRPN Salt Lake City". In 2008, Cincinnati television station WBQC-LD promoted its conversion to digital broadcasting by rebranding itself "WKRP-TV".

Launched on May 4, 2026, Grant County Broadcasters officially rebranded its "Oasis" radio network in the Greater Cincinnati and Dayton areas as "WKRP in Cincinnati" after acquiring permission to use the call letters from low-power FM station WKRP-LP in Raleigh, North Carolina. The station, broadcasting on 97.7 FM (formerly WOXY) and 106.7 FM, utilizes a nostalgic rock format as a tribute to the series. To launch the rebranding, the station featured series star Gary Sandy, who played program director Andy Travis, recording promotional announcements and aired the show's theme song for six hours leading up to the debut.

== Music ==
=== Musical themes ===
WKRP had two musical themes, one opening and the other closing the show.

The opening theme, a soft rock/pop number called "WKRP in Cincinnati Main Theme," was composed by Tom Wells, with lyrics by series creator Hugh Wilson, and was performed by Steve Carlisle. An urban legend circulated at the time that Richard Sanders (who had comparable vocal characteristics to those of Carlisle) had recorded the song. Wilson stated in the commentary for the first season's DVD set that this was not true. Sanders would later "sing" the lyrics in a promo spot on VH1 for The New WKRP in Cincinnati that parodied the music video for U2's song "Numb."

The closing theme was a different song with more of a hard rock sound performed by Atlanta musician Jim Ellis, played over scenes from the episodes followed by a still photograph, later film footage, of the Cincinnati skyline. Ellis recorded the song as a demonstration for Wilson, and as he had not yet written lyrics for it, Ellis mumbled nonsense words. Wilson chose to use the demo version because he found the gibberish lyrics funny and a satire on the unintelligible lyrics of many rock songs.

A longer version of the original theme song was released in 1981 on a 45-rpm vinyl single on the MCA Records label. It peaked at 65 on the Billboard Hot 100 chart in 1981 and at 29 on the Adult Contemporary chart in 1982. A lightly remixed version then appeared on Carlisle's 1982 LP Steve Carlisle Sings WKRP in Cincinnati. The remix has appeared on some TV-theme compilation albums in place of the hit version.

=== Music licensing ===
The show's use of Blondie's "Heart of Glass" was widely credited with helping the song become a major U.S. hit, and the band's record label Chrysalis Records presented the producers with a gold record award for the song's album Parallel Lines. The gold record can be seen hanging on the wall in the "bullpen" set in many episodes.

The songs were often tied into episode plots, and some pieces of music were even used as running gags. For example, the doorbell chimes at Jennifer's penthouse apartment played "Fly Me to the Moon" (which was later replaced by "Beautiful Dreamer" for copyright reasons).

Wilson has commented that WKRP was videotaped rather than filmed because at the time, music-licensing fees were lower for videotaped programs, a loophole that was intended to accommodate variety shows. Music licensing deals that were cut at the time of production covered only a limited number of years, but when the show entered syndication shortly after its 1982 cancellation, most of the original music remained intact because the licensing deals were still active. After the licenses had expired, later syndicated versions of the show did not feature the music as first broadcast, with stock production music inserted in place of the original songs to avoid paying additional royalties. In some cases (such as during scenes with dialogue over background music), some of the characters' lines were dubbed by soundalike actors, a practice evident in all prints of the show issued since the early 1990s, including those used for its late-1990s run on Nick at Nite.

The expense of procuring licenses for the original music delayed release of a DVD set for years. When a Season 1 set was finally released, much of the music was again replaced and the soundalike vocal dubs were present. Some scenes were shortened or cut entirely, but some deleted scenes that had not been included in the original broadcast were added.

== Home media ==
20th Century Fox Home Entertainment released the first season of WKRP on DVD in region 1 in 2007, with a number of music replacements. Sales of the set were poor, and Fox released no further seasons.

In 2014, Shout! Factory acquired rights to the series for DVD release. Shout! had planned to include all of the copyrighted music that originally aired on the show, and obtained the rights to include what they called "the vast majority of the music", but explained, "In a few cases, it was simply impossible to get the rights." Most of the dialogue dubs done for the 1990s syndication airings were removed, and the original dialogue restored. This release presented the second-season episode "Filthy Pictures" and the third-season episode "Dr. Fever and Mr. Tide" in their original hour-long formats instead of the syndicated two-part versions, bringing the episode count from 90 episodes to 88 episodes.
