= Turkeys Away =

- WKRP in Cincinnati episode
- Episode no.: Season 1 Episode 7
- Directed by: Michael Zinberg
- Written by: Bill Dial
- Original air date: October 30, 1978

Guest appearance
- Michael Fairman as Shoe Store Owner

Episode chronology
← Previous "Bailey's Show"	Next → "Love Returns"

"Turkeys Away" is the seventh episode of the first season of the American sitcom television series WKRP in Cincinnati. It aired on October 30, 1978 and was co-written by story editor Bill Dial and series creator Hugh Wilson. In the episode, station manager Arthur Carlson attempts to pull off the greatest Thanksgiving promotion in radio history: dropping live turkeys from a helicopter.

Based on an actual promotion for a radio station that tossed live turkeys off the back of a truck, "Turkeys Away" has been praised by fans and critics and is widely considered to be the most famous episode of the series (frequently replayed during the Thanksgiving season). The episode was included in TV Guide's 100 Greatest Episodes of All-Time.

== Synopsis ==
Station manager Arthur Carlson attempts to get more involved in the day-to-day operations of WKRP by coming up with a Thanksgiving publicity stunt that he keeps secret from the entire staff, save for sales manager Herb Tarlek: a special turkey giveaway, dropping the live birds from a helicopter outside a busy shopping center with a banner that reads "Happy Thanksgiving from WKRP."

Les Nessman goes to the Pinedale shopping mall for a remote broadcast to promote the event. Initially unaware of what will happen, he begins reporting on it as a normal news story before realizing, in horror, that Carlson and Tarlek are throwing live turkeys. The crowd begins to run for their lives as the turkeys violently crash into the ground, as Nessman describes it, "like sacks of wet cement." At one point, Nessman evokes Herbert Morrison's emotional description of the 1937 Hindenburg disaster, "One just went through the windshield of a parked car. This is terrible, Oh, the humanity!"

Back at the studio, disc jockey Dr. Johnny Fever operates the board while Andy Travis, Venus Flytrap and Bailey Quarters listen in and silently react in humorous disbelief. When Nessman loses contact with the studio in the melee, Fever sarcastically quips to the audience "For those of you who just tuned in, the Pinedale shopping mall has just been bombed with live turkeys...Film at 11!"

Following the incident, the station is bombarded with phone calls from the Humane Society and the Cincinnati mayor. Travis attempts to assuage the mayor's concerns by saying no humans were hurt during the incident.

Both Carlson and Tarlek return to the station, disheveled and covered in feathers. Carlson cannot understand what went wrong and still believes it was perfectly planned. Nessman returns, shellshocked, and recounts how he jammed himself into a phone booth after some members of the crowd began to descend on him. He also claims that the surviving turkeys mounted a counter-attack.

The episode ends with Carlson telling the staff, "As God is my witness, I thought turkeys could fly."

== Cast ==
- Gary Sandy as Andy Travis
- Gordon Jump as Arthur Carlson
- Loni Anderson as Jennifer Marlowe
- Richard Sanders as Les Nessman
- Tim Reid as Venus Flytrap
- Frank Bonner as Herb Tarlek
- Jan Smithers as Bailey Quarters
- Howard Hesseman as Dr. Johnny Fever
- Michael Fairman as the shoe store owner

== Background ==
The plot of "Turkeys Away" is based on a true story. WKRP in Cincinnati creator Hugh Wilson — who adapted Carlson's character from Jerry Blum, a general manager of radio station WQXI in Atlanta from 1960 to 1989 — recounted that the episode was inspired by a similar live turkey giveaway promotion by Blum, who tossed turkeys out of a pick-up truck at a Dallas shopping center parking lot.

According to The Atlanta Journal-Constitution, Blum said in 1996 that following the disastrous promotion, he quipped, "I didn’t know turkeys couldn't fly," almost word-for-word what Carlson says at the end of the episode.

"The public went nuts fighting over the turkeys and it was a mess," Blum said. "That was about the whole story... To my knowledge, the turkey drop was never repeated."

Other aerial turkey drops have also been documented in Yellville, Arkansas, where the local Chamber of Commerce has over the years sponsored the Turkey Trot Festival and featured turkeys being dropped from a low-flying airplane.

== Reception ==
The A.V. Club's Brandon Nowalk called Richard Sanders's description of the turkey drop "creative and gruesome and downright hilarious," adding, "The whole gag happens offscreen, including the turkeys apparently organizing a counterattack, but vivid lines like that and Sanders' shell-shocked delivery, not to mention the way he's hugging the wall, make it come alive."

In 1997, TV Guide ranked "Turkeys Away" episode at number 40 on its '100 Greatest Episodes of All Time' list. In 2009, it moved to #65.

In 2026, WKRP-FM, a real-life station in the Cincinnati metropolitan area that had adopted the WKRP calls in 2026 in homage to the TV series, announced its own Turkey Drop in homage to the "Turkeys Away" episode. Unlike the version depicted in the episode in which live turkeys were thrown, this version uses rubber turkeys and a format similar to a duck derby; contestants whose rubber turkey lands on a ground-based target will win a cash prize.
