= The New WKRP in Cincinnati =

American sitcom (1991–1993)

- Genre: Sitcom
- Created by: Hugh Wilson
- Based on: WKRP in Cincinnati by Hugh Wilson
- Starring: Gordon Jump; Richard Sanders; Frank Bonner; Mykelti Williamson; Tawny Kitaen; French Stewart
- Music by: Steve Tyrell; Tom Wells; Jim Ellis (closing)
- Country of origin: United States
- Original language: English
- No. of seasons: 2
- No. of episodes: 47

Production
- Running time: 22 minutes
- Production company: MTM Enterprises

Original release
- Network: Syndication (including WSTR-TV)
- Release: September 7, 1991 – May 22, 1993

Related
- WKRP in Cincinnati

The New WKRP in Cincinnati is an American sitcom television series that aired in first-run syndication from September 7, 1991, to May 22, 1993, as a sequel to the original CBS sitcom WKRP in Cincinnati (1978–1982). As with the original WKRP, MTM Enterprises produced the show.

Gordon Jump (Arthur Carlson), Frank Bonner (Herb Tarlek), and Richard Sanders (Les Nessman) reprised their roles from the original show, while Howard Hesseman reprised the role of Dr. Johnny Fever on a recurring basis (four episodes in the first season, then five in season two). Other original cast members came in for guest spots, with Loni Anderson (Jennifer Marlowe) returning for two episodes and Tim Reid (D.J. Gordon Sims/Venus Flytrap) for the first episode. Other recurring players from the original series who appeared as guests on this sequel show included Carol Bruce (Lillian "Mama" Carlson), Edie McClurg (Lucille Tarlek), Allyn Ann McLerie (Carmen Carlson) and Bill Dial (Bucky Dornster).

The week before the show's premiere, many stations carrying the program aired the hour-long WKRP in Cincinnati 50th Anniversary Special, centered on a newspaper reporter interviewing Arthur Carlson about the fictitious station's golden anniversary, which served as a setup to show clips of memorable moments from the original series.

== Synopsis ==
The New WKRP in Cincinnati revisits radio station WKRP, a station that had slowly climbed from near-last in the ratings to a top-10 station over the course of the original series under Program Director Andy Travis (unseen in this series, since Gary Sandy had left television in 1982 in frustration with the role having typecast him). In the nine years since, another program director, Steve "The Savage" DeMarco (also unseen), had arrived at the station. At the time of the new series' debut, general manager Arthur Carlson (Gordon Jump), the son of station owner Lillian "Mama" Carlson, had just fired DeMarco after DeMarco's reckless on-air antics had embroiled the station in major controversies and jeopardized the station's license with the Federal Communications Commission, as the station had fallen back into its previous pattern of malaise after Travis's departure.

With the station's 50th anniversary approaching, Mr. Carlson hires new program director Donovan Aderhold (Mykelti Williamson) to help restore the station to the success it had a decade prior. While almost all of the staff from the original series has already left in the intervening years, three long-time employees remain: boorish sales manager Herb Tarlek (Frank Bonner), inept news director Les Nessman (Richard Sanders), and unseen overnight jock Moss Steiger, who dies in season 2. Already at the station when Donovan arrives are DJs "the Morning Maniacs" Jack Allen (Michael Des Barres) (who previously appeared in the original series as a different character, the singer of the band "Scum of the Earth") and Dana Burns (Kathleen Garrett), whose real-life marriage is failing behind the scenes. Donovan soon also hires sexy night-time DJ Mona Loveland (Tawny Kitaen). Off the air, other staff members initially included traffic/continuity co-ordinator Claire Hartline (Hope Alexander-Willis); sporadically seen engineer Buddy Dornster (John Chapell); receptionist Ronnie Lee (Wendy Davis); and, after a few episodes, assistant sales manager Arthur Carlson, Jr. (Lightfield Lewis).

The show underwent many cast changes during its run, eventually dropping or replacing most of the initial "new" cast. Partway through the first season, the characters of Dana Burns and Ronnie Lee were written out. Ronnie's replacement as receptionist was spacey blonde Nancy Braithwaite (Marla Rubinoff). Dana's character was not replaced.

After the first season, more characters were dropped: Claire Hartline, Jack Allen, and Arthur Carlson, Jr. all disappeared. French Stewart joined the cast in the second season as morning DJ Razor D.

Dr. Johnny Fever (Howard Hesseman) made a few appearances as a guest in season 1; he participated in a four-episode story arc in season 2 where he takes over the late Moss Steiger's overnight jock position. Mona Loveland was quietly written out towards the end of season 2 and does not appear in the last five episodes. Donovan Aderhold quit the station in the next-to-last episode and was seemingly killed off in a plane crash at the episode's conclusion. Donovan does not appear and is not mentioned in the series finale.

A number of cast members from both old and new series wrote and directed episodes of the series. Howard Hesseman, in addition to appearing in nine episodes, directed two others in which he did not appear. Bill Dial wrote or co-wrote 13 episodes of the series, while Richard Sanders co-wrote three episodes with his wife. Frank Bonner directed five episodes, mostly in season 2, and Mykelti Williamson directed one episode. Non-cast members Asaad Kelada and Max Tash combined to direct most of the show's other episodes; among other notable non-cast members in the production staff included Burt Reynolds, Loni Anderson's then-husband, who directed one of Jennifer Marlowe's two appearances in the series in a stunt casting move, and Los Angeles conservative talk radio personality Doug McIntyre, who wrote two episodes.

As was the case with the aforementioned Andy Travis, Bailey Quarters was completely absent from the series (in her case, her absence is explained; she had left radio many years earlier and was now a successful politician, serving as mayor of Ann Arbor, Michigan).

The show ended production in 1993 after two seasons and 47 episodes. Only the "original three" characters of Mr. Carlson, Herb Tarlek, and Les Nessman remain with the program for the entire run and are seen in every episode.

For the first several episodes, the series was still identified as WKRP in Cincinnati and used a nearly identical opening sequence to the original series, except with updated cast names. The New portion was not added to the title until later when clips of the starring actors were added to the title sequence. The familiar opening and closing themes of its parent series were also retained, and while a new arrangement/recording was used for the opening theme, the closing theme was the same version heard on the original series (although a bit faster).

The series followed up on some details left unaddressed in the original series. For example, the actual frequency of WKRP was never revealed in the original series. (Promos for the original series had noted, without specifying a frequency, that the station used the highest available frequency on the AM dial (at the time, before the AM expanded band was opened, this was 1610 AM, used only in the U.S. for noncommercial travelers' information stations.) In this version, the station is identified as being at 1530 AM, the actual home of WCKY, also licensed to Cincinnati, though the actual 1530 AM is a 50,000-watt class A clear channel frequency, while WKRP's coverage map promoted the station as a 5,000-watt Class B station (with the exception of the original series pilot, in which the station was also at 50,000 watts).

Also addressed is why the station is in the same position as the original series, which was supposed to conclude with everyone's hard work paying off and the station reaching number six, explained by Andy Travis's replacement dragging the station through various controversies prior to the pilot.

== Main characters ==
Actor	Character	Seasons	Notes
Gordon Jump	Arthur Carlson ("Big Guy")	1–2	The middle-aged general manager, whose main qualification for the job is that his business tycoon mother is the owner. His bumbling, indecisive management is one of the main reasons the station is unprofitable, although he is a decent man and something of a father figure to his employees.
Frank Bonner	Herb Tarlek	1–2	Boorish, a tasteless advertising sales manager, who wears loud plaid suits, with his belt matching his white shoes. While Herb is portrayed as buffoonish most of the time, he does occasionally show a sympathetic side, particularly towards Art Jr., whom he feels he needs to protect though there's no love lost between the two.
Richard Sanders	Les Nessman	1–2	Fastidious, bow-tied news reporter, who approaches his job with absurd seriousness. In between the original series and the revival, Les married and divorced a woman named Demi, an unseen character who still looms large in his life. Les is also now an eight-time winner of the "Buckeye Newshawk Award", up from five during the original series.
Mykelti Williamson	Donovan Aderhold	1–2	The station's new program director, Aderhold fills the same position held by Andy Travis, who had left the station sometime after the end of the original series. He has also worked with former WKRP morning DJ Dr. Johnny Fever at a radio station in Pittsburgh. Near the end of the series, he falls in love and, pursuing his new flame, leaves the station; when he attempts to return in the penultimate episode, his plane disappears, with his fate never resolved.
Hope Alexander-Willis	Claire Hartline	1	The station's traffic and continuity director, who is kind and levelheaded, and one of the few competent employees at the station. Claire disappears without comment or explanation at the end of season 1, and the character is never referenced again (and her job position at the station is not replaced)
Howard Hesseman	Dr. Johnny Fever (ne Johnny Caravella)	1–2 (recurring)	Former WKRP morning man who often drops by the station between jobs in various cities. (As Herb complains, "He only shows up here when he's broke!") Partway through the second season, the station's never-seen overnight jock (Moss Steiger, carrying over from the original series) dies, and Johnny is hired to take over the WKRP night shift, billing himself as "The Night Doctor". After a run of several episodes, he leaves the station to pursue a sitcom opportunity in LA. Though it doesn't pan out, Johnny decides to stay in LA, and the character exits the series.
John Chappell	Buddy Dornster	1–2 (recurring)	The station's hopelessly lazy chief engineer. Buddy is the brother of Bucky Dornster (Bill Dial), who held the same job on the original WKRP, and who appears in a cameo on the revival. John Chappell appeared as Reverend Drinkwater in the "Preacher" episode of the original WKRP.
Carol Bruce	Lillian "Mama" Carlson	1–2 (recurring)	Arthur Carlson's ruthless, domineering mother and the owner of WKRP.
Michael Des Barres	Jack Allen	1	One-half of WKRP's morning team, "Burns & Allen, the Morning Maniacs". Jack's marriage to broadcasting partner Dana Burns is extremely volatile; the two are perpetually on the brink of divorce and constantly spar verbally both on the air and off. Dana does in fact leave Jack partway through season one, and Jack continues at the station as a solo DJ. However, the character stops appearing after the end of season one and is never referenced again. Des Barres appeared in one episode of the original series as "Dog" of the band "Scum Of The Earth".
Kathleen Garrett	Dana Burns	1	The other half of the "Burns & Allen" morning team, who is both sharp-tongued and feisty. Garret left the series about halfway through the first season, and her character was written out—but she still appeared in the opening credits of every first-season episode.
Wendy Davis	Ronnie Lee	1 (recurring)	The quiet-but-friendly, and efficient receptionist. A fairly minor character, she leaves partway through season 1 to get her master's degree.
Tawny Kitaen	Mona Loveland	1–2	The station's new nighttime DJ, hired by Aderhold, joins the cast a few episodes in. Beautiful and talented, Mona is also exceptionally intelligent, much like Jennifer Marlowe in the original series. Kitaen left the series before the end of season 2 but is credited in the final five episodes despite her character having been written out.
Katherine Moffatt	Edna Grinbody	1–2 (recurring)	Head of the Cincinnati League Of Decency (CLOD), and an occasional complainant about the station's on-air practices. Often manipulated into serving the station's interests, due to her infatuation with Johnny.
Lightfield Lewis	Arthur Carlson, Jr.	1	Obnoxious, spoiled, proto-yuppie who is brought into WKRP as the new assistant sales manager working under Herb. (Although as he reminds everybody, his grandmother owns the station, so he expects to be moving up the ladder quickly.) Brought in a few episodes into the run, Art Jr. was written out after season 1, though still occasionally referenced. The character was played—as a child—in one episode of the original WKRP by Sparky Marcus.
Marla Jeanette Rubinoff	Nancy Braithwaite	1–2	Nancy is initially seen in a single episode as an attractive, though somewhat ditzy ad rep who is unaccountably lustful for Herb Tarlek. After Ronnie leaves WKRP, Nancy successfully schemes to get Ronnie's old job, mostly so she can continue to try seducing "Herbie". Although initially a recurring player, actress Rubinoff quickly worked her way up to a co-starring role in the opening credits.
French Stewart	Razor D	2	The new morning DJ as of season 2. An eccentric former monk, Razor has almost no radio experience to speak of, but has strong natural talent.

== Episodes ==
=== Series overview ===
Season	Episodes	Originally released	
Season	Episodes	First released	Last released
1	24	September 7, 1991	May 16, 1992
2	23	September 5, 1992	May 22, 1993

=== Season 1 (1991–92) ===
No. overall	No. in season	Title	Directed by	Written by	Original release date	Prod. code
1	1	"How Did We Get Here?" "WKRP in Cincinnati 50th Anniversary Special"	Max Tash	Bill Dial	September 7, 1991	1890
A reporter from Radio & Records chronicles the 50th anniversary of WKRP by interviewing Arthur Carlson. The interview turns into an ambush as the reporter repeatedly brings up every embarrassing moment in the station's history, dating back to its sign-on erroneously reporting the bombing of Pearl Bailey but focusing mainly on the station's 1978–82 heyday as a rock station. Arthur Carlson is the only series regular to appear in new material in this clip show.
2	2	"Where Are We Going?: Part 1"	Max Tash	Bill Dial	September 14, 1991	1801
Mr. Carlson gets arrested after the program director is fired following a string of major controversies. He hires a new program director following his release (unaware that he is black, to his visible discomfort), and learns his mother plans to sell the station. The characters of Donovan, Jack, Dana, Claire, Ronnie and Buddy all debut in the episode.
3	3	"Where Are We Going?: Part 2"	Max Tash	Bill Dial	September 21, 1991	1802
Johnny Fever and Jennifer Marlowe help save the station from threats from the FCC and the Cincinnati League of Decency. Mona makes her debut at the episode's conclusion.
4	4	"Every Move a Work of Art"	Max Tash	Bill Dial	September 28, 1991	1803
Mr. Carlson's son — Arthur Carlson Jr., a.k.a. "Little Big Guy" — comes to work for the station, very much a yuppie. His first deal is with a so-called circus.
5	5	"Then Came Nessman"	Asaad Kelada	Steve Stoliar	October 5, 1991	1810
After a dog bite convinces Les Nessman his death is imminent, he makes a pledge to live each day as if it were his last.
6	6	"Lotto Fever"	Peter Baldwin	Bob Wilcox	October 12, 1991	1806
Herb Tarlek buys a lottery ticket based on numbers that came to him in a dream, but his wife forces him to sell the ticket to "Little Big Guy."
7	7	"The Cincinnati Kids"	Peter Baldwin	Stephen A. Miller	October 19, 1991	1807
Mr. Carlson agrees to a charity poker match with the general manager of WPIG. The only problem: he doesn't know how to play, leaving the staff (including Mona, who is revealed as a recovering gambling addict) to school him before the match.
8	8	"Cincinnati's Favorite Couple"	Art Dielhenn	Max Tash	October 26, 1991	1805
When marital problems between Jack and Dana escalate into a food fight at an upscale restaurant, it leaves the staffers to find a way to positively spin the events before they ruin the station.
9	9	"Here Comes Everybody: Part 1"	Asaad Kelada	Richard Chapman, Bill Dial	November 2, 1991	1822
On his way to Chicago, Johnny Fever stops by the station. When word of his visit gets out, it seems a lot of people are looking for him.
10	10	"Here Comes Everybody: Part 2"	Asaad Kelada	Richard Chapman, Bill Dial	November 9, 1991	1825
Johnny has a number of people meet him at the station, and takes money from some to pay off debts to others.
11	11	"The Real Thing"	Frank Bonner	George Geiger	November 16, 1991	1809
A wire report makes Les thinks Cincinnati has come under nuclear attack. While he's not believed, staffers still take pause to reflect on their lives.
12	12	"Good Ole Radio Days"	Max Tash	Craig Nelson	November 23, 1991	1808
After a ratings dip, the station puts on an old-fashioned radio drama to drum up publicity. Meanwhile, Herb is mistaken for a space alien while out on a sales call. Debut of the character of Nancy (at this point a media buyer for an outside firm), and the final episode of receptionist Ronnie. Nancy would take over as WKRP's receptionist beginning with the next episode.
13	13	"Venus, We Hardly Knew Ya"	Max Tash	Max Tash	January 11, 1992	1824
Gordon Sims, now CEO of a large communications company, visits the station, and takes a little piece of his Venus Flytrap alter ego when he leaves.
14	14	"Hip Hop Krp"	Buzz Sapien	Bill Dial	January 18, 1992	1828
Donovan hires some inner city kids as interns. When Claire's computer soon goes missing, suspicion immediately falls upon them.
15	15	"You Are My Sunshine, My Only Sunshine"	Frank Bonner	Gail Honigberg	January 25, 1992	1813
Claire moves in with Mona after a cooking accident, and Claire's boyfriend's eye soon wanders. Mona and Dana conspire to find out just where Gus' heart is.
16	16	"Razor D Rules"	Max Tash	Stephen Nathan	February 1, 1992	1804
With revenue down, Arthur and Donovan have to let go of a DJ — the afternoon's Phil Spindle. He does not take the news well, and barricades himself in the booth for a farewell to the city. Despite the episode title, the character of Razor D (who would be introduced in season 2) does not appear in this episode.
17	17	"Jennifer and the Prince"	Burt Reynolds	Ron Friedman	February 8, 1992	1823
Jennifer Marlowe returns to announce her engagement to a prince, and invites the staff to the party. However, a coup by her fiancé's brother and the suspicions of Herb and Les give her a lot to deal with.
18	18	"Long Live the King"	Max Tash	Marilyn Marko-Sanders, Richard Sanders	February 15, 1992	1817
Les gets a surprise phone call after editorializing against rival WPIG's Elvis lookalike contest: a caller claiming to be Elvis himself, and offering an exclusive interview. Final episode for Dana; it's mentioned in a later episode that she left Jack for good, an event which took place offstage.
19	19	"Mamma Was a Rolling Stone"	Frank Bonner	Richard Chapman, Bill Dial	February 22, 1992	1829
Trouble follows Johnny Fever on another visit to WKRP, as he deals with his mother (played by Annie Ross, who in real life was only 9 years older than Howard Hesseman.) At the same time, the station deals with a naked DJ and a surprise FCC visit.
20	20	"Number One Fan"	Stephen Rothman	Mark Roberts	February 29, 1992	1826
A woman claiming to be Les' "number one fan" kidnaps him, while Herb unknowingly sells stolen karaoke machines to an undercover cop and gets arrested.
21	21	"Herb's Got a Guy"	Ginger Grigg	Gail Honigberg	April 25, 1992	1815
Mama Carlson sets up a meeting between Herb and Carter Kimball, the owner of 30something Lodges, in an effort to start landing national ad business. However, business isn't the only thing about Herb that interests Mr. Kimball.
22	22	"Chicken a La Russe"	Max Tash	Doug McIntyre	May 2, 1992	1831
A hypnotist accidentally leaves Big Guy thinking he's a chicken upon hearing the word "colonel." A visiting Russian colonel, there to learn of American broadcasting, creates obvious complications.
23	23	"Where's Jack"	Ron Sossi	Bill Dial	May 9, 1992	1827
Mona, alone for her birthday, and Jack, just dumped by Dana, make a connection at surprise party organized by Claire. Final episode for Jack; several episodes later it's mentioned he left the station, but no further explanation is offered.
24	24	"Spies Like Us"	Jay Broad	Jay Broad	May 16, 1992	1830
The president appoints Donovan to a broadcasting commission, but the FBI must clear him before he can go to Washington. Final episode for both Claire and Art, Jr.

=== Season 2 (1992–93) ===
No. overall	No. in season	Title	Directed by	Written by	Original release date	Prod. code
25	1	"Donovan, Don't Leave Us"	Asaad Kelada	Bill Dial	September 5, 1992	2890
A one-hour retrospective to kick off the second season. It's mentioned that Art, Jr. has been "shipped off" to graduate school.
26	2	"Razor's Edge"	Asaad Kelada	Bill Dial	September 12, 1992	2804
After the morning crew leave WKRP, Donovan hires a replacement, Razor D, who is not exactly as he appears.
27	3	"Retreading on Thin Ice"	Asaad Kelada	Gail Honigberg	September 19, 1992	2812
Herb, attempting to land the Sam Bass tires account, sets up the beautiful female sales rep with Donovan, not knowing her husband is Mr. Bass.
28	4	"Sex, Lies & Videotape"	Asaad Kelada	Bob Wilcox	September 26, 1992	2806
On his way to a lunch with Nancy, Herb gets into a traffic accident. The other driver feels Herb was at fault, and sues him and the station.
29	5	"Can't We Get Along?"	Frank Bonner	Bill Dial	October 3, 1992	2803
The station starts airing editorials from Lash Rambo (a thinly veiled fictionalization of real-life conservative commentator Rush Limbaugh), whom many DJs object to. In protest, Razor plays Ice-T's "Cop Killer", making Mr. Carlson decide just how extreme, to either side, the station should be willing to go.
30	6	"Studs of the Airwaves"	Ginger Grigg	Ron Friedman	October 10, 1992	2811
Looking to generate publicity, Herb has a radio version of Studs with Les, Donovan, and Buddy. The winner ends up going on a very surprising date.
31	7	"Nancy in Charge"	Buzz Sapien	Gail Honigberg	October 17, 1992	2816
Nancy's fib about owning WKRP backfires when the advertising executive she told it to decides to visit the station the same day Mama Carlson does.
32	8	"Play Razor for Me"	Stephen Rothman	Bob Wilcox	October 24, 1992	2815
Razor unknowingly dates a woman who works for rival station WPIG, and the staff race to prevent her from uncovering station secrets.
33	9	"Loveland to Look At"	Steve Rothman	Steve Stoliar	October 31, 1992	2805
After Mona agrees to pose nude for Playboy, Mama Carlson demands she be fired if she follows through. This leads Buddy, Razor, and Herb to protest in the lobby.
34	10	"Strange Bedfellows"	Asaad Kelada	Doug McIntyre	November 7, 1992	2814
After an on-air spat with his wife, Arthur temporarily moves into Donovan's place.
35	11	"Moss Dies"	Frank Bonner	Bill Dial	November 14, 1992	2813
After nighttime DJ Moss Steiger dies, Johnny Fever returns to pay his respects and helps the staff carry out his last wishes. Complicating matters is a morgue attendant who claims Moss was Chinese.
36	12	"Flimm Flam Man"	Frank Bonner	Mark Roberts	November 21, 1992	2809
Johnny Fever, taking over the nighttime slot, discovers a map indicating there may be treasure in the Flimm Building. When the staff find the map, a gold rush ensues.
37	13	"Nancy's Old Man"	Howard Hesseman	Unknown	January 16, 1993	2817
When Nancy's salesman father visits, he's not just trying to sell weight-loss products.
38	14	"Herb's Lost Weekend"	Howard Hesseman	Unknown	January 23, 1993	2818
Desperately trying to make a sale so he can vacation with Lucille, Herb's lies come back to haunt him.
39	15	"Murder by Les"	Ginger Grigg	Don Hart	January 30, 1993	2801
Les feels his career is over after two of his talk show guests die.
40	16	"Fever in the Morning"	Asaad Kelada	Marilyn Marko-Sanders, Richard Sanders	February 6, 1993	2819
Though afraid of heights, Johnny Fever vows to set a time record for broadcasting from a billboard.
41	17	"Fever All Through the Night"	Asaad Kelada	Marilyn Marko-Sanders, Richard Sanders	February 13, 1993	2820
With two days to go to break the record, Edna makes it difficult for Johnny to stay on the billboard.
42	18	"Johnny Goes Hollywood"	Buzz Sapien	Doug McIntyre	February 20, 1993	2822
Johnny Fever sees Hollywood is not what he'd hoped after he's offered his own sitcom about his life at WKRP. Final episode for both Dr. Johnny Fever (Howard Hesseman), and Mona Loveland (Tawny Kitaen). Johnny gets a full, proper send-off -- but Mona simply disappears and is never referred to again after this episode (although Kitaen remains in the opening credits for the rest of the series.)
43	19	"Old Boyfriend"	Stephen Rothman	Joel Kimmel	February 27, 1993	2807
Nancy believes her ex-boyfriend has returned to propose marriage, and she's right, to a degree.
44	20	"Treasure of Sierra Smith"	Ginger Grigg	Gail Honigberg	May 1, 1993	2823
Donovan falls in love with a new deejay who holds him responsible for losing out on signing with an agent. Nia Peeples makes the first of two appearances as Sierra Smith.
45	21	"My Fair Nun"	Mykelti Williamson	Ron Friedman (story); Bill Dial (teleplay)	May 8, 1993	2821
Razor D gives some bad habits to a nun-to-be sampling life outside the convent.
46	22	"Chicago Story"	Frank Bonner	Unknown	May 15, 1993	2826
Donovan leaves WKRP to follow Sierra to her new job in Chicago. The episode ends on an unresolved cliffhanger, with Donovan set to return to the station when his plane is reported missing.
47	23	"Father of the Groom"	Buzz Sapien	Bob Wilcox (story); Bill Dial (teleplay)	May 22, 1993	2824
Herb's son and an heiress fall in love. Bizarrely, the cliffhanger from the previous episode is left unresolved; Donovan does not appear and is not mentioned.

== Critical reception ==
Several critics of the show railed against the thought of continuing the original series, and it premiered to a mix of positive and negative reviews. Among the negative reviews from broadcast professionals was the charge that the station, broadcasting on the AM band, was still playing Rock 'n Roll music in the early 1990s, long after FM was established as the industry's leading music band, while most AM stations were adopting talk, all-news and all-sports formats.

As a syndicated program, its time slot differed in various markets. The series was able to operate in the black, but did not produce enough of a profit for investors to back it financially.
