= Arthur Carlson =

Character on the television situation comedy WKRP in Cincinnati

- WKRP in Cincinnati character
- Portrayed by: Gordon Jump

In-universe information
- Alias: The Big Guy
- Gender: Male
- Occupation: General Manager of WKRP
- Family: Hank Carlson (father); Lillian Carlson (mother)
- Spouse: Carmen Carlson
- Children: Arthur Carlson Jr (son); Melanie Carlson (daughter)
- Nationality: American

Arthur Carlson, aka "The Big Guy" is a fictional character on the television situation comedy WKRP in Cincinnati (1978–82), the general manager of the low-rated Cincinnati radio station WKRP. The character was also a regular on the "revival" series, The New WKRP in Cincinnati (1991–93), still working as general manager of WKRP. He was played by Gordon Jump in both shows.

== Before and after the format change ==
Carlson is a well-meaning, bumbling, childlike man who is completely out of touch with the changes that have occurred in the radio and music business since he started working in the pre-rock era of the early 1950s. He keeps his job as general manager of WKRP only because his mother, Lillian Carlson, better known as "Mama Carlson", owns the station. Unbeknownst to him, his mother has set up WKRP as a tax write-off that is intended to lose money, and she keeps him at the station not because she wants him to succeed but because she expects him to fail.

Flashbacks in the episode "Bah, Humbug" reveal that Carlson joined WKRP as sales manager in the early 1950s. When his mother fired the previous station manager for being too generous to the employees, Arthur got his job. (He tells Andy Travis that he's been general manager of the station since 1955.) WKRP then spent the next 20+ years as a "beautiful music" station, but with the rise of rock n' roll music, WKRP's seriously outdated format became a sure money-loser, appealing only to senior citizens. According to Carlson himself, by 1978 the station was losing $100,000 a year.

In the pilot of WKRP, the new program director, Andy Travis, convinces Carlson that switching the format to rock n' roll might make the station successful and profitable; Carlson, who wants desperately to prove to his mother that he can be a success, goes along with the change and even gets the nerve to defend Andy's changes to his mother. Only when Arthur shows that much backbone does his mother relent and keep to the format change....although it's much later revealed that she fully expects that format to be a money-loser as well.

== "Management" style ==
Though he accepts the format change, Carlson is not a fan of rock n' roll music (though he does admit to Andy that he likes Crosby, Stills and Nash), and frequently does not even listen to his own station because he doesn't enjoy the songs or the modern, with-it styles of the disc jockeys. As the series goes on, however, Carlson becomes more accepting of the format and the changing cultural trends. In the episode "In Concert," after eleven kids are trampled to death at a concert by The Who (based on a real-life incident that happened in Cincinnati in 1979), the staff fears that Carlson, who feels guilty about having helped to promote the concert, will change their format back to "elevator music." But Carlson, who was at the concert and actually found himself enjoying the music (before he learned what happened), understands that the stadium's first-come, first-served seating was to blame for the tragedy, and not the band or the music. "We're a rock n' roll station," he declares, "and we're going to stay a rock n' roll station."

Because Carlson doesn't know much about music or business, he spends most of his time sleeping or playing with various toys he keeps in his office: model trains, a miniature basketball and hoop, or toy soldiers. He defends this practice by saying "I'm not a child -- I'm a hobbyist." He is also an avid fisherman, keeping several rods and reels in his office at all times and speaking eloquently of the joys of hooking a fish and then throwing it back.

Carlson has trouble dealing with people, especially with saying "no"; he will buy anything from a salesman (WKRP sales manager Herb Tarlek once sold him an insurance policy) and tends to whimper when someone yells at him. To protect him from the outside world, he depends on his receptionist, Jennifer Marlowe, whose main job is keeping people away from her boss by any means necessary, including telling them that he's dead. Jennifer and Carlson have an agreement: she doesn't take memos, and she doesn't serve coffee. ("Turkeys Away")

Despite these foibles, Carlson has a very strong sense of right and wrong, and at times, stands up for what he believes in and can even be confrontational. This is revealed in an episode where a sleazy photographer (George Wyner) snaps nude pictures of Jennifer as she is changing in another room following a cheesecake photo shoot with Andy Travis. When Carlson finds the pictures in the photographer's studio, he grabs the photographer by his shirt and threatens a lawsuit. In another episode, he gently but firmly supports Andy's decision to fire a new disc jockey replacing Johnny Fever, after it is proven that the DJ (Philip Charles MacKenzie) is being paid with cocaine under a payola plan with a record producer.

Some episodes, particularly in the first season, show Carlson feeling left out at the station and wanting to prove that he, too, can come up with good ideas to make WKRP more successful. The most famous such attempt is chronicled in "Turkeys Away," where Carlson tries to become actively involved in every aspect of running the station, driving the employees crazy with incessant suggestions. He then comes up with what he describes as a brilliant idea for a Thanksgiving promotion, but, distrustful of Andy and the other "casually dressed" employees, he won't tell anyone what the promotion is, except the obsequious Herb. On the day of the promotion, with news director Les Nessman covering it live, the WKRP staff discovers that Carlson and Herb are throwing live turkeys out of a helicopter. The birds promptly plummet to their deaths. When Carlson returns, covered with feathers, he admits: "As God is my witness, I thought turkeys could fly." (Carlson had released the remaining turkeys on the ground; they promptly attacked Carlson and Herb, which is how the two of them got covered in feathers.) Despite the fiasco, the employees realize that they need to make Carlson feel more respected and wanted at the station. This was not the only Carlson sales idea fiasco; according to Johnny Fever, Carlson once tried to sell 3,000 blonde Dolly Parton wigs on the air; when that failed, Carlson donated them to the Red Cross for earthquake victims.

Being generally a straightforward, uncomplicated kind of person, Carlson sometimes acts as a father figure to members of his staff. By using a low-key, friendly approach, he helps Herb face up to his alcoholism problems, and in the episode "Who is Gordon Sims", he assists Venus in coming to terms with his past as an Army deserter (albeit with mixed feelings, as Carlson himself had served in the Marine Corps and is initially very taken aback at hearing of Venus' desertion).

Although genial and rather bumbling, Carlson does display a quick wit at times. In the episode "Changes", after overhearing Venus and Johnny Fever discuss Venus' racial identity concerns in the station's record library, Carlson offers some advice to Venus. When Johnny then asks him what he was doing hanging out in the record library in the first place, Carlson replies, deadpan, that he was "looking for old Guy Lombardo records and smoking dope."

== Personal life ==
Arthur Carlson was said to be 48 in a 1979 episode; this would give him a birth year of 1930 or '31. He comes from a successful family of Cincinnati business people. Arthur's grandfather, who is seen in one episode in a dream (also played by Gordon Jump), was a miserly businessman who built up Carlson Industries. He left it to Arthur's father, Hank, a sweet-natured man who was more interested in having a good time than running the business. Hank married Lillian, a former actress in Broadway musicals, who soon proved to have a talent for business and took the family business more seriously than Hank did. Eventually, Lillian took over the corporation entirely, and Hank died soon after. Because his father died when he was very young, Arthur Carlson was raised mostly by his mother and by her sarcastic butler, Hirsch (Ian Wolfe). Carlson was an officer in the Marine Corps; he has mentioned being at Guadalcanal as well having learned some Japanese. (However, note that any service in WWII would clash with a 1930/31 birthdate; Carlson would have to have been born circa 1924 or earlier in order to have participated in the Guadalcanal campaign. Note also that when he mentions Guadalcanal he is very drunk, and Jennifer, to whom he is speaking, assumes that he is remembering not WWII but a time when was on vacation.) In speaking with "Venus Flytrap", Carlson says he saw combat, but does not specify which war.

Mama Carlson belittles him and shows no open signs of affection; she rebuffs his attempts to hug him by pushing him aside and saying "keep away from me!" She admits to Andy Travis that she "pushed and bullied" Arthur to make him tough and self-sufficient, like her; however, she realizes that the tactic failed and made him even more weak-willed than his father.

He is married to Carmen (Allyn Ann McLerie), a sweet-natured woman who is almost as shy as he is: though they are happily married, their main problem is that they are so anxious to avoid hurting each other's feelings that they rarely tell each other what they really think. They have a son, Arthur Jr. (Sparky Marcus in the original series, Lightfield Lewis in the revival), whom they sent off to military school on Mama Carlson's advice; this proved to be a mistake when it turns "Little Arthur" into a nasty, racist, borderline fascist. In the first season, Carlson takes his son out of military school, to live with his parents and go to public school, but later references suggest that Little Arthur gets worse, not better; in one episode, it is revealed that Little Arthur wants to join the American branch of the Nazi Party, and in another, it's stated that he wants to join the PLO. Arthur Jr. returns in The New WKRP in Cincinnati, joining the station as an account executive; he has since abandoned his radical ways and become a petulant, spoiled yuppie who expects to be promoted to his father's job. Arthur Jr. is not seen after the first season of the revival. During the course of the series, Carmen has a surprise pregnancy and, after she and Arthur decide they want the baby, she gives birth to a daughter, whom she and Arthur hope they can raise their own way, without the mistakes they made with their son. The girl's name is later revealed to be Melanie in a subsequent episode; she does not appear in the revival.

In the episode "A Simple Little Wedding", it is revealed that Arthur and Carmen have been married for 25 years, and that they eloped when Mama Carlson began taking control of their wedding. When they decide to renew their vows and have a small wedding ceremony (after a humorous aside when Jennifer and Bailey together seductively tell Carlson that he should "play the field" first), Mama Carlson initially agrees to remain in the background. When Mama Carlson's characteristic need to control asserts itself again, Arthur and Carmen decide to elope again for the second time.

Carlson maintains a professional relationship with Jennifer, an attractive employee with the highest pay. She provides the support that his mother did not. He knows that Jennifer, despite her apparent self-reliance, really cares about him and, in her own way, depends on him too; "You need me to need you," he tells Jennifer in one episode. Carmen is friendly with Jennifer and shows no jealousy or suspicions of her.

Aside from Jennifer, Carlson also relies heavily on Andy Travis. Although their initial meeting was rocky (Carlson didn't remember hiring Andy over the phone, and then tried to fire him after the station's format change to rock and roll), Carlson often turns to Andy for advice (such as when he decided to turn down a funeral home's business because he found their advertising campaign to be tasteless) and often stands behind Andy when Andy's required to make tough decisions (such as firing a DJ who was taking payola from a record company).

Carlson is tempted once in the course of the series, by his first receptionist, Joyce Armour (Rosemary Forsyth). When Joyce stops by to recruit WKRP's business for her rep firm, she takes Carlson out for drinks and then asks him to come see her at her hotel room. A nervous Carlson initially thinks Joyce is coming on to him and so brushes her off, but eventually decides to visit her. After a couple of drinks, and some confused conversation, Joyce explains to Carlson that she was simply trying to drum up some business for her firm, and never intended to mislead him. Carlson replied that she didn't, it was merely his usual misinterpreting of a situation. Joyce then tells Carlson that she was flattered he was attracted to her, stating "If you weren't married I'd camp on your doorstep," to which Carlson replied before departing, "If I wasn't married, you wouldn't be camping very long."

Carlson is a Republican; he belongs to the local Kiwanis Club as well as the Rotary Club, attends church every Sunday (Gordon Jump had been a practicing Mormon since the 1960s), and teaches Sunday School. He also drives a Dodge (at a time when Chrysler was teetering on the brink of bankruptcy). In the episode "Clean Up Radio Everywhere," his socially conservative leanings cause him to befriend the Reverend Dr. Bob Halyers, the Jerry Falwell-esque leader of an organization dedicated to purging "obscene" songs from the airwaves. Shocked at reading some of the sexually suggestive lyrics that are being played on his station, Carlson orders his employees to follow Halyers' suggestions and not play those songs. But when Halyers delivers another list of songs to ban (including songs WKRP hasn't played yet), Carlson defies Halyers and refuses to cooperate with him anymore, leading to a boycott of WKRP's sponsors. In the closing scene of the episode, Carlson reaffirms that he likes Halyers personally, but that he won't submit to censorship, and he warns Halyers that anyone who would be cowardly enough to cooperate with him is bound to change his tune when the political winds shift. Carlson's religious views are also brought forward in the episode "God Talks to Johnny"; when Johnny believes that God is speaking to him and starts to go a little crazy, Carlson helps Johnny regain a sense of normalcy by telling him that it's all right if he thinks God is speaking to him, as long as God doesn't tell him to "get naked and hang out at the airport".

== Inspiration and casting ==
According to Jay Sandrich, director of the WKRP pilot, MTM Enterprises originally wanted Roddy McDowall to play Carlson. When McDowall was unavailable, Sandrich recommended Jump, who had just played a memorable role for Sandrich as the bumbling Police Chief Tinkler on the show Soap. Arthur Carlson was the first character to be cast, and subsequent roles auditioned by cold-reading a scene with Jump.

Carlson was a parody of Jerry Blum (c.1932–February 16, 2019), the President and General Manager of WQXI in Atlanta, Georgia, from 1960 to 1989. The turkey drop, in particular, was a much-exaggerated version of one of Blum's real stunts, when he attempted to drop turkeys off the back of a truck and caused a melee of people looking for a free turkey; Carlson's postmortem was lifted, with only slight alteration, from Blum's own reaction to his stunt. Whereas Carlson was weak and indecisive, Blum was in many ways the opposite, a brash and in-your-face personality (hence his nickname "Big Guy") frequently seen in oversized sunglasses and a buttoned-down leisure suit.
