= List of WKRP in Cincinnati episodes =

WKRP in Cincinnati is an American situation comedy television series that features the misadventures of the staff of a struggling fictional radio station in Cincinnati, Ohio. The series was created by Hugh Wilson and originally aired on CBS from September 1978 to April 1982.

== Series overview ==
Season	Episodes	Originally released	
Season	Episodes	First released	Last released
1	22	September 18, 1978	June 4, 1979
2	24	September 17, 1979	March 31, 1980
3	22	November 1, 1980	April 12, 1981
4	22	October 7, 1981	April 21, 1982
Special		1980	

== Episodes ==
=== Season 1 (1978–79) ===
- Producer: Hugh Wilson
- Story editors: Tom Chehak, Bill Dial, Blake Hunter

No. overall	No. in season	Title	Directed by	Written by	Original release date
1	1	"Pilot"	Jay Sandrich	Hugh Wilson	September 18, 1978
Andy Travis takes over as program director at WKRP, a Cincinnati easy listening station, and his first act is to change the format to rock music.
2	2	"Pilot, Part 2"	Michael Zinberg	Hugh Wilson	September 25, 1978
While Andy tries to come up with a publicity stunt to advertise the format change, a group of elderly listeners invades the station protesting the removal of their favorite music.
3	3	"Les on a Ledge"	Asaad Kelada	Hugh Wilson	October 2, 1978
When an athlete accuses him of being gay, Les climbs out on the ledge of WKRP's building and threatens to jump.
4	4	"Hoodlum Rock"	Michael Zinberg	Hugh Wilson	October 9, 1978
WKRP sponsors its first rock concert, by the British "hoodlum" group ("we're... several cuts below punk") Scum of the Earth, whose members (Michael Des Barres, Peter Elbling, and Jim Henderson) are well-dressed, articulate, and initially well-behaved, but that soon changes. Des Barres and his real band, Detective, performed the Scum of the Earth music.
5	5	"Hold-Up"	Asaad Kelada	Tom Chehak	October 16, 1978
Johnny does a live remote from a stereo shop owned by huckster Del Murdoch (Hamilton Camp), but an out-of-work DJ (Garry Goodrow) shows up with a gun and hijacks the broadcast.
6	6	"Bailey's Show"	Asaad Kelada	Joyce Armor & Judie Neer	October 23, 1978
Shy, unassertive Bailey finally gets her chance to produce when WKRP does a public service interview show, but her first guest (Woodrow Parfrey), purportedly a child psychologist, turns out on the air to be nothing of the sort.
7	7	"Turkeys Away"	Michael Zinberg	Bill Dial	October 30, 1978
Mr. Carlson decides to take a more hands-on managerial approach by doing the greatest Thanksgiving promotion in radio history - dropping live turkeys from a helicopter. In 1997 TV Guide ranked this episode at number 40 on its '100 Greatest Episodes of All Time' list. In 2009, it moved to #65. It is based on a real event that happened at WQXI, the station many of the WKRP characters were based on.
8	8	"Love Returns"	Asaad Kelada	Bill Dial	November 6, 1978
Andy has to choose between love and work when his ex-girlfriend, country singing star Linda Taylor (Barrie Youngfellow), offers him the chance to go on the road with her. The show was placed on hiatus for two months after this episode aired.
9	9	"Mama's Review"	Asaad Kelada	Hugh Wilson	January 15, 1979
In a clip show, Andy and Mr. Carlson recount to Mama Carlson what has been happening at the station since it switched to a rock format. This episode was designed to reintroduce audiences to the show after the two-month hiatus; new footage features only Andy, Mr. Carlson, Mama Carlson, Jennifer, Bailey and Venus. Herb, Les and Johnny are seen only in flashbacks consisting of archive footage from previous episodes.
10	10	"A Date with Jennifer"	Asaad Kelada	Richard Sanders & Michael Fairman	January 22, 1979
When Les wins the coveted Silver Sow Award, he asks Jennifer to be his date for the banquet, and she says yes. A jealous Herb tries to get Mr. Carlson to institute a policy against employee dating.
11	11	"The Contest Nobody Could Win"	Asaad Kelada	Casey Piotrowski	January 29, 1979
Thanks to an on-air slip-of-the-lip by Johnny Fever, WKRP is forced to offer a $5,000 contest prize instead of just the intended $50.00, but Andy and Venus hatch a plan to make the contest unwinnable. The episode, as aired, featured Vincent Schiavelli in a crucial role. An earlier unbroadcast 30-minute rough cut version appears on the Shout Factory DVD set of WKRP, apparently by mistake. It is identical to the broadcast episode for about the first 17 minutes, but after that features scenes that were later reshot, a very different ending, and John Wheeler playing Schiavelli's role (and two additional actors playing photographers).
12	12	"Tornado"	Will Mackenzie	Blake Hunter	February 5, 1979
A tornado hits Cincinnati. When Andy gets injured by a breaking window, Johnny Fever becomes too emotional, and Les' disaster readiness plan turns out to have more to do with communists than natural disasters, Mr. Carlson has to go on the air and take charge.
13	13	"Goodbye, Johnny"	Asaad Kelada	Blake Hunter	February 19, 1979
Johnny is offered a better-paying job in Los Angeles, and his co-workers at WKRP try to manipulate him into staying in Cincinnati.
14	14	"Johnny Comes Back"	Asaad Kelada	Blake Hunter	February 26, 1979
Johnny leaves for the job in L.A. but is soon fired. He returns to WKRP, where the new morning man (Philip Charles Mackenzie) seems like a nice guy but turns out to have a dirty secret. Sam Anderson makes the first of four appearances on the show, here as DJ job applicant Mason Noble -- as WKRP's DJs all use aliases on the air, it's possible Anderson's later appearance as on-air DJ "Rex Earhart" is meant to be this same character.
15	15	"Never Leave Me, Lucille"	Asaad Kelada	Bill Dial	March 5, 1979
Herb breaks up with his wife Lucille (Edie McClurg) and moves in with Johnny. Jennifer tries to get Herb and Lucille back together again so she won't have to put up with Herb's advances.
16	16	"I Want to Keep My Baby"	Asaad Kelada	Hugh Wilson	March 19, 1979
A woman who listens to Johnny's show leaves her baby at the station. Johnny refuses to turn the baby over to child services until he has contacted the mother.
17	17	"A Commercial Break"	Rod Daniel	Richard Sanders & Michael Fairman	March 26, 1979
Herb lines up the biggest sales contract in the station's history—over $200,000 per year to record and run a commercial jingle for the owner of a funeral home chain (Fred Stuthman), who wants to sell plots to a younger demographic.
18	18	"Who Is Gordon Sims?"	Rod Daniel	Tom Chehak	April 2, 1979
Venus has to reveal that he is wanted as a deserter from the United States Army because he went AWOL just days after returning Stateside at the end of his Vietnam service, eight years before joining WKRP.
19	19	"I Do, I Do... For Now"	Will Mackenzie	Tom Chehak	April 23, 1979
Jennifer pretends Johnny is her husband to ward off a childhood friend from West Virginia (Hoyt Axton) who shows up in Cincinnati expecting her to go through on their teenage agreement to get married.
20	20	"Young Master Carlson"	Will Mackenzie	Hugh Wilson	May 7, 1979
Mr. Carlson's obnoxious son (Sparky Marcus) runs away from military school, and Mama Carlson decides that he should be given a short-term job at the station.
21	21	"Fish Story"	Asaad Kelada	Hugh Wilson	May 28, 1979
Herb dresses up as the WKRP mascot, a carp, and gets into a fight with the WPIG pig (played by Lee Bergere). Johnny and Venus take an on-air alcohol test with a police officer (Jerry Hardin), with Johnny's reflexes strangely improving with each drink. The script for this episode is credited to "Raoul Plager," who does not exist. Series creator Hugh Wilson actually wrote the episode under duress from the network to infuse the show with more physical comedy, and used the alias to signal his frustration with their demands.
22	22	"Preacher"	Michael Zinberg	Bill Dial	June 4, 1979
Andy tries to fire the Reverend Little Ed Pembrook (Michael Keenan), who sells John the Baptist shower curtains and The World Is Coming to an End lawn furniture on his show.

=== Season 2 (1979–80) ===
- Executive producer: Hugh Wilson
- Producers: Bill Dial, Rod Daniel
- Executive story consultant: Blake Hunter
- Story editors: Dan Guntzelman, Steve Marshall, Steven Kampmann, Peter Torokvei

No. overall	No. in season	Title	Directed by	Written by	Original release date
23	1	"For Love or Money: Part 1"	Will Mackenzie	Mary Maguire	September 17, 1979
Johnny makes a date with Bailey for a movie, then stands her up when he gets a call from Buffy (Julie Payne), his demented ex-girlfriend who is suing him for palimony.
24	2	"For Love or Money: Part 2"	Will Mackenzie	Mary Maguire	September 24, 1979
Johnny's friends rush over to help him deal with Buffy's threat of a lawsuit.
25	3	"Baseball"	Hugh Wilson	Hugh Wilson	October 15, 1979
Les accepts a challenge for WKRP to play a softball game against the number one station in town, WPIG.
26	4	"Bad Risk"	Will Mackenzie	Tom Joachim & Gene Fournier	October 22, 1979
Herb moonlights as an insurance salesman and sells a comprehensive policy to a depressed Les, who promptly has a bizarre accident with his motor scooter.
27	5	"Jennifer Falls in Love"	Will Mackenzie	Paul Robinson Hunter	October 29, 1979
Jennifer falls in love for the first time in her life, with a man named Steel (Thomas Callaway) who is almost her male equivalent; blonde, beautiful, and a gold-digger.
28	6	"Carlson for President"	Will Mackenzie	Jim Paddock	November 5, 1979
While running for City Council, Mr. Carlson blurts out a damaging piece of information about the incumbent (Howard Witt) during a televised debate. Feeling guilty, he tries to throw the election.
29	7	"Mike Fright"	Will Mackenzie	Dan Guntzelman	November 12, 1979
During a garbage strike, Johnny jokingly tells his listeners to dump their trash on the steps of City Hall. When hundreds of people actually do so, Johnny becomes so self-conscious about his influence that he finds himself unable to talk on the air.
30	8	"Patter of Little Feet"	Will Mackenzie	Blake Hunter	November 26, 1979
Mr. Carlson's wife Carmen (Allyn Ann McLerie) reveals that she's pregnant. Mr. Carlson's initial joy turns to worry as he starts to think she is having the baby only to please him, while his mother recommends an abortion.
31	9	"Baby, If You've Ever Wondered"	Rod Daniel	Bill Dial	December 3, 1979
In the latest ratings, WKRP goes from #16 to #14 in the Cincinnati market. Everyone considers this a cause for celebration except Andy, who feels like a failure because the climb in ratings isn't greater.
32	10	"Bailey's Big Break"	Will Mackenzie	Steve Marshall	December 10, 1979
Bailey gets the job of assistant newscaster, but a jealous Les tries to keep her from getting a regular spot on the air.
33	11	"Jennifer's Home for Christmas"	Rod Daniel	Dan Guntzelman & Steve Marshall	December 17, 1979
Jennifer's friends think she is going to be alone for Christmas, so each of them arrives at her apartment with a tree.
34	12	"Sparky"	Rod Daniel	Steven Kampmann & Peter Torokvei	December 24, 1979
Mr. Carlson hires former Reds manager Sparky Anderson as the host of a sports interview show "The Bullpen", which turns out to be such a disaster that Carlson has no choice but to fire his hero.
35	13	"God Talks to Johnny"	Will Mackenzie	Hugh Wilson	December 31, 1979
After Johnny hears what he thinks might be God speaking to him, everybody thinks he's going crazy, including Johnny himself.
36	14	"A Family Affair"	Rod Daniel	Tim Reid	January 7, 1980
After getting angry at Venus for going out with his sister Carol (Allison Argo), Andy overcompensates to prove he is not a racist.
37	15	"Herb's Dad"	Rod Daniel	Steven Kampmann & Peter Torokvei	January 14, 1980
Herb's father, the salesman Herb Tarlek Sr. (Bert Parks), runs away from the Shady Rest nursing home and asks his son to lend him money so he can go to California on yet another scheme.
38	16	"Put Up or Shut Up"	Will Mackenzie	Blake Hunter & Steve Marshall & Steven Kampmann	January 21, 1980
Jennifer is tired of Herb making passes at her. At Bailey's suggestion, she tries to call Herb's bluff by actually accepting a date with him.
39	17	"The Americanization of Ivan"	Hugh Wilson	Story by : Hugh Wilson; Teleplay by : Dan Guntzelman & Steve Marshall	January 28, 1980
A visiting Soviet hog expert (Michael Pataki) asks Bailey to help him defect to the United States.
40	18	"Les's Groupie"	Rod Daniel	Story by : Paul Robinson Hunter; Teleplay by : Steve Marshall	February 4, 1980
Les goes out on a date with a woman (Kristina Callahan) who listens to his show, and after they spend one night together, she moves into his house and takes over his entire life.
41	19	"In Concert"	Linda Day	Steven Kampmann	February 11, 1980
The entire WKRP staff is overcome with feelings of guilt and anger after a major rock concert they helped to promote results in the deaths of eleven concertgoers. This episode directly referenced The Who concert disaster at Cincinnati's Riverfront Coliseum on December 3, 1979. Controversial by nature, the episode was facing preemption in Cincinnati by Robert Gordon, then-vice president of Cincinnati's CBS affiliate; Gordon initially felt the episode was in poor taste, but reconsidered after watching a preview and realizing the episode dealt not with the concert tragedy itself, but the solemn aftereffects and the growing need to prohibit "festival seating", which was viewed as a main catalyst for the disaster.
42	20	"The Doctor's Daughter"	Frank Bonner	Lissa Levin	February 18, 1980
Johnny has to figure out how to act like a father when his college-aged daughter Laurie (Patrie Allen) comes to visit with her obnoxious boyfriend (Derrel Maury).
43 44	21 22	"Filthy Pictures"	Rod Daniel	Story by : Hugh Wilson; Teleplay by : Dan Guntzelman & Steve Marshall	March 3, 1980
A sleazy photographer (George Wyner) takes nude pictures of an unsuspecting Jennifer while she's in a changing room, and her friends try to find a way to steal the photos before he sells them to a magazine. (This one-hour episode aired in two parts for syndication.)
45	23	"Venus Rising"	Nicholas Stamos	Dan Guntzelman & Steve Marshall	March 10, 1980
Venus is tempted by a job offer from WREQ, but learns it's an automated station whose manager (Terry Kiser) only wants him as a token hire. Meanwhile, Herb makes a bogus claim of another job offer, hoping for a raise, but it backfires. Venus negotiates a deal with Andy that settles all issues.
46	24	"Most Improved Station"	Rod Daniel	Richard Sanders & Michael Fairman	March 31, 1980
After WKRP loses a "Most Improved Station" broadcasting award while Johnny wins one for "Best Radio Personality," in-fighting starts among the WKRP staffers, and a special meeting is called so they can work out their problems.

=== Season 3 (1980–81) ===
- Executive producer: Hugh Wilson
- Supervising producer: Rod Daniel
- Producers: Blake Hunter, Steven Kampmann, Peter Torokvei
- Story consultants: Dan Guntzelman, Steve Marshall
- Story editor: Lissa Levin

No. overall	No. in season	Title	Directed by	Written by	Original release date
47	1	"The Airplane Show"	Rod Daniel	Richard Sanders & Michael Fairman	November 1, 1980
To compete with WPIG's traffic helicopter, Les starts reporting the news from a pre-World-War-II biplane (specifically, a 1934 Waco UMF) piloted by a deranged veteran (Michael Fairman) on Veterans Day. This is the fourth of five episodes in which the script is co-credited to Richard Sanders (Les Nessman) and actor/writer Michael Fairman, who previously appeared as the shoe store owner who complains that Les is blocking his doorway in the season 1 episode "Turkeys Away." Flying stunts were performed by Harold Johnson, an accomplished aviator and then-serving mayor of Moraine, Ohio, just north of Cincinnati, and childhood hometown of series star Gary Sandy. This is the first of five consecutive episodes that take place largely (though not entirely) outside the station.
48	2	"Jennifer Moves"	Linda Day	Hugh Wilson	November 8, 1980
Jennifer buys a house in the suburbs. As the staff helps her move, the neighbors prove to be cheating husbands, jealous wives, corrupt phone servicemen, and worse; meanwhile, Les hears voices on the upper floor and Herb can't successfully negotiate the piano into the house.
49	3	"Real Families"	Rod Daniel	Peter Torokvei	November 15, 1980
The reality show "Real Families" does an episode about Herb and Lucille (Edie McClurg) and their kids, where the hosts (Peter Marshall and Daphne Maxwell, pre-Reid) seem eager to disprove the unconvincing claim by Herb's colleagues that he's a "hard worker, loyal husband, and all-around fine person."
50	4	"The Baby"	Rod Daniel	Blake Hunter	November 22, 1980
Mr. Carlson's wife goes into labor. The whole gang goes to the hospital to be there when she gives birth, but Mr. Carlson has second thoughts about being in the delivery room with her.
51	5	"Hotel Oceanview"	Rod Daniel	Steven Kampmann	November 29, 1980
To land the coveted Vicky Von Vickey jeans account, Andy, Mr. Carlson, and Herb travel to a hotel in Dayton to make a presentation to the company president (guest star Dr. Joyce Brothers). While there, Andy deals with projector issues, Herb makes time with Ms. Vickey's sexy assistant (Linda Carlson), a transgender woman with whom Herb went to school when she presented as male, and everyone is afraid of becoming the next victim of the Dayton Poisoner.
52	6	"A Mile in My Shoes"	Rod Daniel	Dan Guntzelman	December 6, 1980
When Herb has jury duty, Andy takes over sales and Venus takes over programming.
53	7	"Bah, Humbug"	Rod Daniel	Lissa Levin	December 20, 1980
In a dream brought on by eating one of Johnny's brownies, Mr. Carlson encounters three ghosts who show him why he's making a mistake by not giving generous Christmas bonuses.
54	8	"Baby, It's Cold Inside"	Rod Daniel	Blake Hunter	January 3, 1981
On a day when the heat is not working at the station, Mama Carlson comes to visit, gets drunk on liquor confiscated from Johnny Fever, and starts reminiscing about her late husband.
55	9	"The Painting"	Rod Daniel	Steven Kampmann	January 10, 1981
Bailey is enamored of a painting Herb bought at Mr. Carlson's church auction, while Herb only cares about finding a way to make some money on it.
56	10	"Daydreams"	Rod Daniel	Peter Torokvei	January 17, 1981
While Mr. Carlson rehearses a boring speech about radio history that he has written for an upcoming conference/banquet, his employees drift off into a series of personal daydreams.
57	11	"Frog Story"	Rod Daniel	Bob Dolman	January 24, 1981
After Herb accidentally sprays pink paint over his daughter's pet frog, Greenpeace, he brings it to the station looking for a way to save it.
58	12	"Venus and the Man"	Rod Daniel	Hugh Wilson	January 31, 1981
Trying to talk a gang leader (Keny Long) out of quitting school, Venus bets the young man that he can teach him about the structure of the atom in only two minutes. The original broadcast of this episode featured a pre-credits sequence in which Loni Anderson, surrounded by the entire cast and crew, spoke directly to the viewing audience, breaking the Fourth Wall to welcome home those who had just returned from the Iran Hostage Crisis.
59	13	"Dr. Fever and Mr. Tide: Part 1"	Rod Daniel	Steve Marshall	February 7, 1981
A network employee (Mary Frann), who has eyes for Johnny, convinces him to take on hosting duties for a TV show with a large salary; when Johnny realizes it is a disco show, he realizes he cannot back out of the deal without a protracted legal fight, so he creates a new persona, the disco-loving Rip Tide. Initially hoping to keep Johnny Fever and Rip Tide separate, Johnny finds it increasingly difficult to keep Rip Tide off WKRP's airwaves.
60	14	"Dr. Fever and Mr. Tide: Part 2"	Rod Daniel	Steve Marshall	February 7, 1981
Conclusion. Rip Tide begins to spill even further into John Caravella's personal life, as he goes out as Rip Tide at night and finds he enjoys the money and fame. With Les concluding Johnny has developed a schizoid disorder, the staff of WKRP are divided: Andy and Herb would rather keep Rip, but the others would much rather have the old Johnny. Johnny finally finds the will to abandon Rip and sends his alter ego off with an on-air meltdown.
61	15	"Ask Jennifer"	Linda Day	Joyce Armor & Judie Neer	February 14, 1981
Jennifer steps in as the voice of an advice talk show titled "Ask Arlene" when the planned host turns out to be a pill-popper. Jennifer quickly finds success, but wants out once a piece of advice goes wrong.
62	16	"I Am Woman"	Linda Day	Lissa Levin	February 21, 1981
Bailey leads a campaign to save the home of WKRP, the Flimm Building, from being torn down. Mr. Carlson withdraws his support after Mama Carlson offers to finance a new home for the station, leading to a confrontation.
63	17	"Secrets of Dayton Heights"	Frank Bonner	Jon Smet	February 28, 1981
Les learns that the man who raised him was not his biological father, and that his real father (Bill McLean) was once a Communist and is now a barber in a nearby town.
64	18	"Out to Lunch"	Dolores Ferraro	Story by : Ben Elisco; Teleplay by : Peter Torokvei	March 14, 1981
Co-workers suggest to Herb that his three-martini lunches with clients are turning him into an alcoholic. Guest star: Craig T. Nelson.
65	19	"A Simple Little Wedding"	Nicholas Stamos	Blake Hunter	March 21, 1981
Mr. Carlson and his wife decide to renew their marriage vows. Just as she did with the planned first wedding, Mama Carlson tries to take over the event, while Herb throws a predictably tacky bachelor party for Mr. Carlson.
66	20	"Nothing to Fear But..."	Asaad Kelada	Story by : Tim Reid; Teleplay by : Dan Guntzelman	March 28, 1981
Everyone becomes paranoid after the station is robbed.
67	21	"Till Debt Do Us Part"	Frank Bonner	Howard Hesseman & Steven Kampmann	April 5, 1981
When his first ex-wife gets engaged, Johnny is overjoyed about no longer having to pay her alimony, but worries that her fiancé (Hamilton Camp) is a womanizing creep.
68	22	"Clean Up Radio Everywhere"	Linda Day	Hugh Wilson and Max Tash	April 12, 1981
Evangelist Dr. Bob Halyers (Richard Paul), a take-off on Jerry Falwell, threatens WKRP with a boycott unless they stop playing songs with "obscene" lyrics.

=== Season 4 (1981–82) ===
- Executive producer: Hugh Wilson
- Producers: Blake Hunter, Peter Torokvei, Dan Guntzelman, Steve Marshall
- Story consultant: Lissa Levin

No. overall	No. in season	Title	Directed by	Written by	Original release date
69	1	"An Explosive Affair: Part 1"	Linda Day	Steve Marshall	October 7, 1981
WKRP receives a bomb threat from the terrorist group "Black Monday," and Andy sends Johnny and Venus to broadcast from the transmitter while the station is being searched. Meanwhile, Mr. Carlson's former secretary (Rosemary Forsyth) visits, and he misreads her desire to meet for lunch.
70	2	"An Explosive Affair: Part 2"	Linda Day	Steve Marshall	October 14, 1981
Andy realizes the threatened bomb is actually at the transmitter where he's sent Johnny and Venus. He tries to contact them, but Johnny has smashed the phone out of frustration over a missed bet on a horse. Luckily, with help from the police, Johnny and Venus get out before the bomb explodes.
71	3	"The Union"	Linda Day	Blake Hunter	October 21, 1981
While the station's employees consider unionizing, Mr. Carlson deals with feelings of betrayal.
72	4	"Rumors"	Linda Day	Peter Torokvei	October 28, 1981
Johnny stays at Bailey's place while his apartment is being fumigated, leading to rumors that the two are having a sexual affair.
73	5	"Straight from the Heart"	Dan Guntzelman	Dan Guntzelman	November 4, 1981
Herb secretly checks into a hospital for heart tests, but then sneaks out and takes Les to a 3D pornographic movie.
74	6	"Who's on First?"	Dan Guntzelman	Dan Guntzelman	November 11, 1981
Mr. Carlson has to pretend to be Herb to make a sale while Herb is in the hospital, while Les pretends to be Mr. Carlson, and Johnny pretends to be Andy to avoid paying a gambling debt.
75	7	"Three Days of the Condo"	Linda Day	Lissa Levin	November 18, 1981
Johnny receives a $24,000 legal settlement from the L.A. station that fired him. To stop Johnny from wasting the windfall, Venus advises Fever to invest in a condo at Gone With the Wind Estates.
76	8	"Jennifer and the Will"	Dolores Ferraro	Blake Hunter	December 2, 1981
After Jennifer's elderly boyfriend Colonel Buchanan (Pat O'Brien) dies while out on a date with her, she discovers she has been named executrix of his will.
77	9	"The Consultant"	Dolores Ferraro	Hugh Wilson	December 30, 1981
Mama Carlson hires a professional radio consultant (David Clennon) to evaluate WKRP, and the consultant threatens Andy with a bad report unless the station subscribes to his programming services.
78	10	"Love, Exciting and New"	Frank Bonner	Lissa Levin	January 6, 1982
Andy spends time with Mama Carlson in order to talk her into replacing the station's transmitter, but he starts to think she might be sexually harassing him. Actress Colleen Camp plays herself on air for Les Nessman's "Show Beat" segment, talking about her (actual) appearance in the 1981 film They All Laughed.
79	11	"You Can't Go Out of Town Again"	Howard Hesseman	Dan Guntzelman	January 13, 1982
Mr. Carlson learns that his wife Carmen first went out with him in college only because her sorority dared her to date someone on the "dip list."
80	12	"Pills"	Asaad Kelada	Steve Marshall	January 20, 1982
WKRP has to do commercials for a client (Robert Ridgely) whose "diet pills" are actually a legalized form of speed.
81	13	"Changes"	Will Mackenzie	Peter Torokvei	January 27, 1982
Venus tries to act and dress more stereotypically "black" to prepare for an interview with a militant magazine, whose writer (Tom Dreesen) turns out to be white; meanwhile, Herb adopts a classier image with Jennifer's help.
82	14	"Jennifer and Johnny's Charity"	Will Mackenzie	Blake Hunter	February 3, 1982
Class conflict is in the air when Johnny's friends from the fire-damaged Vine Street Mission meet Jennifer's wealthy friends who are preparing to donate money to rebuild it.
83	15	"I'll Take Romance"	Asaad Kelada	Lissa Levin	February 17, 1982
Les goes out with a woman (Livia Ginise) he met through a computer dating service, not realizing the service is a front for prostitution.
84	16	"Circumstantial Evidence"	Frank Bonner	Tim Reid & Peter Torokvei	February 24, 1982
A woman (Daphne Maxwell) frames Venus as her accomplice in an armed robbery.
85	17	"Fire"	Will Mackenzie	Dan Guntzelman	March 17, 1982
Herb and Jennifer are stuck in an elevator together when a fire shuts down the Flimm Building.
86	18	"Dear Liar"	Frank Bonner	Steve Marshall	March 24, 1982
In a take-off on the Janet Cooke scandal, Bailey drafts a fictional character to serve as the focus of a news story on a children's hospital, only to have Les read it on-air when she leaves for lunch.
87	19	"The Creation of Venus"	Gordon Jump	Blake Hunter	March 31, 1982
Venus and Andy tell Mama Carlson the real story of how Venus came to work at WKRP. Told mainly in flashback, the show includes a recreation of a scene from the pilot in which Venus meets Mrs. Carlson for this first time. The sequence was completely reshot, as Mama Carlson had been played by Sylvia Sidney in that episode (Carol Bruce took over the role for all other episodes, including this one).
88	20	"The Impossible Dream"	Nicholas Stamos	Richard Sanders & Michael Fairman	April 7, 1982
Egged on by his mother, Les announces that he is going to fulfil his lifelong dream by going to New York to audition for the CBS Evening News.
89	21	"To Err Is Human"	Linda Day	Lissa Levin	April 14, 1982
Herb screws up yet again and Mr. Carlson is finally ready to fire him, but Jennifer tries to find a way to save Herb's job by talking to the businessman (Tom Sullivan) Herb offended. (This was actually the last episode filmed for the series).
90	22	"Up and Down the Dial"	George Gaynes	Dan Guntzelman	April 21, 1982
The new ratings arrive, and WKRP has finally become a successful station, rising to #6 in the Cincinnati market with Johnny Fever as the #1 DJ. But when a new news director (Nicholas Hormann) shows up and says he was hired by Mama Carlson, Andy soon finds out that she plans to change the station to a 24-hour news format.

=== Specials (1980) ===
Two different special presentations of WKRP were produced in 1980.

==== U.S Treasury Department Savings Bond advertisement ====
An 11-minute special, a production of the U.S. Treasury Department, uses the second season version of the opening credits (crediting only Gary Sandy and Gordon Jump, but also showing clips of the rest of the cast) but is not a full episode of the series, nor was it televised. It contains no laugh track and is part of a long-running series from the Treasury in which sitcoms were adapted into commercials for Savings Bonds. For reasons unknown, Universal City Studios claimed copyright on the film despite no involvement with the series (and, as a work for hire for the U.S. government, its copyright eligibility is questionable in and of itself).

Title	Directed by	Written by	Original release date
"A Sure Thing"	Rod Daniel	Hugh Wilson, Steve Marshall	1980
The gang (except Jennifer, who is away) are all experiencing money troubles of one sort or another. Initially skeptical, they listen to Mr. Carlson's pitch for U.S. Savings Bonds.

==== Segment on The Fantastic Funnies ====
The Fantastic Funnies was a 1980 CBS special hosted by Loni Anderson about various newspaper comics. In a 3-and-a-half minute self-contained segment, Howard Hesseman appears in character as Dr. Johnny Fever, hosting his morning radio show in the WKRP broadcast booth. No other series characters appear in this segment.

Title	Directed by	Written by	Original release date
"(Untitled)"	Rod Daniel	Unknown	May 15, 1980
During a newspaper strike in Cincinnati, Johnny reads out the latest Flash Gordon comic over the air.
