= Jennifer Marlowe =

Character on the television situation comedy WKRP in Cincinnati

- WKRP in Cincinnati character
- Johnny Fever (Howard Hesseman) and Jennifer Marlowe
- Portrayed by: Loni Anderson

In-universe information
- Gender: Female
- Occupation: Receptionist
- Nationality: American

Jennifer Elizabeth Marlowe is a character on the CBS sitcom WKRP in Cincinnati (1978–82). She was played by actress Loni Anderson, who received three Golden Globe Award and two Emmy Award nominations for playing the character.

== Fictional character biography ==
Jennifer is a beautiful blonde parody of blonde bombshell actresses such as Marilyn Monroe and Jayne Mansfield. However, in an inversion of the "dumb blonde" stereotype, Jennifer is wise, sophisticated, intelligent, and well-spoken. She became the receptionist at WKRP after moving to Cincinnati, succeeding Joyce Armor (Rosemary Forsyth), who is introduced in a later episode.

Jennifer comes from the fictional town of Rock Throw, West Virginia. She rarely talks about her family or childhood, but some details about her background emerge over the course of the show. She comes from a large and apparently poor family. She was once "engaged" to her old elementary school sweetheart T. J. Watson (played as an adult by Hoyt Axton). She has been on her own since the age of seventeen when she left West Virginia to move to Cincinnati. She largely left her rural roots behind, taking on the persona of an urbane modern woman, but her rural Appalachian upbringing occasionally shows. For example, when speaking to her mother on the phone, she slips out of her adopted Standard American English accent and reverts into her native Appalachian accent. Although not overtly religious, on at least one occasion (episode 35: "God Talks to Johnny") she shows a remarkable ability to recite chapter and verse of the Bible from memory. Although she eschews her poor upbringing she shows no sign of shame in it and once became offended when Mrs. Carlson mistakenly referred to her hometown as "Rock Pile".

After moving to Cincinnati, she soon attracted the attention of various wealthy older men. She rarely dates younger men, claiming "I like older men better. They're so mature and kind, and they tire easily." Her dates, most of whom are never seen, shower her with expensive gifts, allowing her to live in a huge penthouse apartment with a piano and a doorbell that plays the song "Fly Me to the Moon" (in the original network run) or "Beautiful Dreamer". (In subsequent syndication and the original Fox Season 1 DVD release. Shout! Factory restored the original doorbell chime for their subsequent DVD releases.) Also through her wealthy boyfriends, she has made friends with a number of wealthy high-society people, including Ronald Reagan; she implies in one episode that the president offered her the job of Secretary of the Treasury, but she turned it down. Her most frequently mentioned boyfriend is someone referred to only as "The Admiral," who in one episode, flies her to Bethlehem for Christmas. The episode "Jennifer and the Will" introduces another: Colonel Buchanan (Pat O'Brien), who dies and makes Jennifer executrix of his will. Though the papers portray Jennifer as a gold-digging floozy, it turns out that Jennifer has asked the Colonel not to leave her any money; he accedes to her request, leaving her only one dollar, the symbolic first dollar he ever made. Furthermore, when the video will recording of Buchanan specifies that the bulk of his estate be used to fund a celebration and parade for the veterans who served under him, Jennifer immediately begins preparing to fulfill his wishes while his greedy family protests this bequest.

== Jennifer at WKRP ==
Jennifer is the receptionist at the AM radio station WKRP. She sits at a desk in the lobby, answering the few phone calls the station gets and taking messages. Jennifer is very clear about what her job does and does not entail: she does not take dictation, type letters, or make or get coffee. As she explains in one episode, "I am a receptionist. Receptionists receive. They offer comfort, provide support, answer a few telephone calls. But they do not type, unless it's for a very good cause." When asked if she belongs to a union, she says she is a member of the exclusive "Sisterhood of Blond Receptionists," adding "If you saw our minimum salary, you'd have a heart attack and die."

Her primary job at the station is providing support and comfort for the station's general manager, Arthur Carlson, a befuddled middle-aged man whose sole qualification for management appears to be that his mother owns the station. Carlson avoids both work and controversy and depends on Jennifer to shield him from people and situations he wants to avoid. Jennifer uses various tactics, including telling people that he's dead.

The first-season episode "Mama's Review" reveals that Jennifer is the highest-paid station employee, with a salary of $24,000 per year ($118,500 today), well above the $17,500 salary ($86,400 today) of Dr. Johnny Fever, WKRP's highest-rated DJ (season 1, "Goodbye, Johnny"). However, there is never any suggestion of impropriety between Mr. Carlson and Jennifer. In fact one of the running gags of the show is Mr. Carlson's almost childlike reliance on Jennifer as a maternal nurturing figure, perhaps due to the fact that Carlson's own mother was anything but nurturing. Mr. Carlson treats Jennifer with great respect and deference, and Mr. Carlson's wife Carmen is also shown to be on very friendly terms with her. And although never spoken, it is evident that Mrs. Carlson considers Jennifer as somewhat of an equal.

Despite her apparent wealth and high-society connections, Jennifer remains at WKRP, unwilling to leave her friends and especially Mr. Carlson, who is almost totally dependent on her; in an episode where she takes the day off and leaves Carlson in charge of the phones, he goes completely to pieces by the end. With her calm, unflappable demeanor and ability to keep her cool in most situations, Jennifer also helps maintain morale among the station's employees; in the episode "Most Improved Station," when the other staff members are bickering uncontrollably, Jennifer brings them back together by explaining the family dynamic at the station and reminding them not to take each other for granted.

Jennifer was noted for being the opposite of the "dumb blonde" stereotype that pervaded television in the late '70s; she is extremely smart and shrewd, and somewhat resentful of the fact that people assume she is dumb based solely on the fact that she is attractive, a point that is played to humorous effect in an episode when Andy convinces all station employees to fool a "program doctor" by acting 180 degrees off their true personality. Her strength and self-possession make her seem almost superhumanly competent. In the episode "Ask Jennifer," she takes over as the host of a call-in advice show, using her intelligence and knowledge to give easy, offhand answers to all her callers' questions, but she does not think enough about the potential consequences of the advice she gives, and when a woman is beaten by her controlling husband as a result of taking her advice to stand up to him, a distraught and guilt-ridden Jennifer quits the show.

== Personal life ==
An episode that reveals some cracks in Jennifer's "perfect" façade is "Jennifer Falls in Love," where she falls for her first non-elderly boyfriend in years: Steel Hawthorne, a handsome blond repairman. When he asks her for a loan, and then makes a pass at her friend, Bailey Quarters, Jennifer realizes that Steel is simply a gold-digger after her money, and she starts to question her own tendency to accept gifts from wealthy men. However, Mr. Carlson convinces her that she is nothing like Steel after all.

However, Jennifer's relationships with the other female characters on the show display the amount of respect they have for her. Mr. Carlson's wife is very friendly towards Jennifer (with no hint of jealousy or concern over her husband's close platonic relationship with her), while Jennifer's relationship with Bailey is often that of two sisters (with Jennifer the older, more experienced one often watching out for the younger, more naive Bailey). The dynamic between them has been compared to that between Ginger and Mary Ann on Gilligan's Island. And although it is never stated outright, it is clear that Mama Carlson views Jennifer as the only person who is her equal at the station.

For the bulk of the show's run, Jennifer is pursued endlessly by Herb Tarlek, the station's married sales manager, who even goes as far as to convince outside parties that he and Jennifer are romantically involved. Jennifer effortlessly rebuffs Herb's clumsy attempts at flirtation, before finally deciding to call his bluff (in the episode "Put Up or Shut Up") and accepting his offer of a date. Herb is so overwhelmed at even the remotest hint of his fantasies coming true that he begins to hyperventilate during their date, and the two end the night by agreeing to be friends.

In spite of Herb's advances, Jennifer tries to help him both personally (when Herb and his wife were separated briefly, Jennifer tried to convince Lucille to take him back) and professionally (when Mr. Carlson was ready to fire Herb over screwing up a $5,000 account, Jennifer spoke to the client, who ultimately proved to be sympathetic). Dr. Johnny Fever also often flirts with Jennifer, but in a somewhat more playful fashion; at one point, she impulsively kissed Johnny and convinced him to act as though they were married. Jennifer once accompanied Les Nessman as his date to an awards banquet. In the episode "Daydreams", Jennifer has an impromptu bedroom fantasy about Cary Grant, who suddenly transforms into Les asking her to cover him "in a sticky substance," startling her awake. She also performs mouth-to-mouth resuscitation on Andy Travis, knocked unconscious during a tornado (to which a semi-conscious Andy replied by putting his arm around her, as in a passionate embrace) and had other flirtatious encounters with him, such as telling him "let's see the boy" in the episode "Baby, it's Cold Inside" when she was drinking to keep warm at work.

Other memorable episodes focusing on Jennifer include "I Do...I Do...For Now," where Jennifer's childhood sweetheart from West Virginia, T. J. (played by Hoyt Axton) Watson, shows up to marry her; "Filthy Pictures," in which a sleazy photographer secretly takes nude pictures of Jennifer with the intention of selling them to a girlie magazine (partly a reference to the famous nude photos of Marilyn Monroe), and "Jennifer Moves," in which Jennifer moves to the suburbs and discovers that her neighbors are all seriously dysfunctional.

== Relationship with Arthur Carlson ==
Though Carlson is often seen as being almost completely dependent on Jennifer, she too has her moments where roles between the pair are reversed, leading to a relationship where they mutually take care of each other. In "Filthy Pictures", Arthur confesses to Jennifer that he and the airstaff broke into the photography studio to rescue nude photos taken secretly of her for a charity photo shoot. She tells him it was a foolish thing to do, but, touched by her boss' defense of her honor, embraces him.

In "Turkeys Away", Jennifer initially refuses to do typical secretarial tasks such as taking dictation or bringing him coffee (reminding Mr. Carlson that "we have an agreement"). However, upon seeing the disheveled and distressed Mr. Carlson after his promotional stunt has gone horribly wrong, Jennifer gently asks Mr. Carlson if he would like some coffee.

In "Jennifer and the Will", Jennifer is upset and overwhelmed at the publicity against her after Colonel Buchanan dies at the table while the pair is enjoying dinner. In a moment of exhaustion over the situation, and sitting in his chair, she leans on Arthur, who is standing next to her. He accompanies her to the funeral to shelter her from the paparazzi attending the graveside service.

In "Ask Jennifer", after she resigns as "Arlene", she sulks away at her desk, telling Andy and Arthur that she intends to simply sit at her desk and keep her mouth shut. Arthur tells her not to, and when she asks him why, he says it's because he needs her. "I don't want someone to need me," she says. "Oh yes, you do," counters Arthur. She asks the two men to leave her desk for a moment to be alone, to which they agree. As she is on the verge of tears, Arthur comes back to her desk, asking her to come into his office, because he needs her. When she asks why, he says his model train is broken. Happy at the thought of being needed for something she can actually be helpful with, she embraces her boss.

== Casting ==
Loni Anderson was recommended to the producers by Ross Bickell, Anderson's then-husband, after Bickell had unsuccessfully auditioned for the part of Andy Travis. Anderson liked the series concept but did not like the character as originally envisioned; after some negotiations, Anderson and Hugh Wilson reshaped the role into its familiar form. Bickell and Anderson divorced over the course of the series, after Anderson had an affair with the man who won the role of Andy Travis over Bickell, Gary Sandy.

== Cultural references ==
Jennifer Marlowe is frequently cited as an example of changing gender roles and the breaking of stereotypes. Jennifer changes the "blonde bombshell" stereotype of Marilyn Monroe and Jayne Mansfield, with a raised consciousness, increased sophistication and unexpected intelligence (Wilson envisioned the character as the smartest person in the room if that person were Lana Turner).

Jennifer and Bailey offer a blonde-brunette dyad typical of sitcoms of the era, providing contrasting portrayals of female sexuality, while at the same time both exploiting and defying the expectation of the "jiggle TV" genre of the era.
