= Andy Travis =

Character on the television situation comedy WKRP in Cincinnati

- WKRP in Cincinnati character
- Bailey Quarters (Jan Smithers) and Andy Travis (Gary Sandy)
- Portrayed by: Gary Sandy

In-universe information
- Gender: Male
- Occupation: program director
- Family: Carol Travis (sister)
- Nationality: American

Andy Travis is a fictional character on the television situation comedy WKRP in Cincinnati (1978–82). He was played by Gary Sandy.

Travis was originally intended to be the lead character, the more-or-less normal person who would anchor the series and provide the focus for most of the stories. He is the subject of the theme song, and one critic went so far as to describe Sandy as "Gary Tyler Moore," a nod to Mary Tyler Moore, who played the similar Mary Richards on The Mary Tyler Moore Show and eponymous owner of WKRP producer MTM Enterprises. As the first season went on, WKRP shifted to being more of an ensemble comedy, where any one of the eight regulars could carry an episode. Despite this change, Sandy retained top billing for all four seasons as the straight man to the rest of the cast.

== Program director ==
In the pilot episode, Andy arrives in Cincinnati to take over as WKRP's program director. He previously worked the same job at a radio station in Santa Fe, New Mexico; but he also ran a station in Albuquerque and in Amarillo, Texas. In that episode, he claims to be from Santa Fe and, in the season two episode "Jennifer's Home for Christmas," he refers to Santa Fe as home. However, in the season three episode "A Mile in My Shoes" Andy tells Smilin' Al, a business owner who advertises on WKRP, that he is originally from Phoenix, Arizona. Andy is young, handsome and friendly, and though he is viewed with suspicion by the old guard at the low-rated station—manager Arthur Carlson, sales director Herb Tarlek, and news director Les Nessman—he soon manages to win them over to his side. Mr. Carlson even defends Andy to his domineering mother, the station's owner, when she wants to fire him.

Convinced that he is not going to last at WKRP, Andy spends about the first month in his apartment without furniture, just in case he has to suddenly leave town. In a flashback episode, it is revealed that Andy got his overweight landlady drunk to charm her into letting him out of his lease, which he does successfully.

Described by Mr. Carlson as a "cowboy", Andy frequently wears boots and a cowboy hat. He also wears very tight jeans to work, which makes Mr. Carlson uncomfortable. "With denim," Andy explains, "I feel comfortable and relaxed. I feel as though I can work better." He wears his hair in the late 1970s "feathered" style, and many of the characters make fun of his abundant hair: Bailey Quarters, asking him to take part in a promotion, asks him to imagine "Your hair flowing in the wind -- now, that stuff will flow!" Though he is usually quiet and low-key, describing himself as "an easy-going guy with a natural ability to lead," he can sometimes lose his temper when his employees will not listen to him, which is more often than not. In response to Johnny Fever's refusal to play his playlist of top 40 hits, Andy jokingly threatens to shoot himself. In fact, a common joke in the series is that Andy often has to literally run to the broadcast booth to stop some unacceptable material being broadcast at that moment.

Andy's first act at WKRP is to change the format from "beautiful music" to top 40 rock n' roll. He has, in his own words, "lived and breathed radio ever since I was a little boy," and his ambition is to turn WKRP around and make it a top-rated station. But he is unable to do what it would really take to improve the station: fire Herb and Les. He has come to feel affection for them, and he also knows a real housecleaning at the station would entail getting rid of Mr. Carlson too.

After his first year on the job, when WKRP only rises from 16th to 14th in an 18-station market, and while the rest of the staff is elated, Andy, though outwardly happy, is furious, and considers it a personal failure. After a conversation with his friend, nighttime disc jockey Gordon "Venus Flytrap" Sims, Andy realizes that he cannot leave WKRP or fire anybody. He likes the people too much, and has made friends here, something that did not happen at the other stations where he worked. Andy decides to abandon his ambition of becoming a hugely successful program director, or as Venus puts it, "You gave up a chance to be Boy Wonder of American radio to be the head guard of a nut farm."

As the series goes on, Andy turns his attention to fighting against the increasingly bland, corporate world of modern radio. In one episode, he meets Norris Breeze (played by thirtysomething co-star David Clennon), a former colleague of his from New Mexico who is now a successful programming consultant. Breeze is appalled by Andy's decision to let the DJs pick the music they like instead of just playing the same songs over and over, like most radio stations. "Nobody is programming their own music," Breeze says. "We are, and that's the way it's going to stay," Andy replies.

A story arc from the final season of WKRP has Andy working behind the scenes to get Mama Carlson to put more money into the station, so that he can improve the place and give the employees raises. When the staff considers unionizing, he strikes a deal with her: he will keep the union out of the station if she will pay higher salaries and allow him to renovate the station's lobby. The others never find out what Andy did.

Also in the final season, Andy takes Mama Carlson out to dinner and the opera, hoping to get her to invest still more money (this time to buy a new transmitter). He begins to wonder if she expects him to sleep with her in exchange for the money. In the end, it turns out that she only wanted to go out with a personable young man on her arm, though she enjoyed allowing him to believe that she had other expectations.

In the final episode, Andy is given his walking papers when Mrs. Carlson announces her plans to change the station's format from Top 40 to all news, despite the station's most recent finish in sixth place in the Cincinnati radio ratings, with the morning show at number one. She reverses her decision after Johnny, who has learned her ulterior motive of changing the format to doom the station to failure like she wants (in order to keep the station as a tax write-off for her other business ventures), threatens to divulge her motive to her son. Just as Mrs. Carlson tells Arthur that she's reconsidered changing the format, a drunken Andy and Venus burst into her home with the intent of telling her off. "Mrs. Carlson...I'm tired of your crud!" Both collapse on her floor.

Between the end of WKRP in Cincinnati in 1982 and the start of The New WKRP in Cincinnati in 1991, he leaves the station. The station's fortunes fall dramatically after his departure, to the point that by the time of The New WKRP in Cincinnati, the station is back in the same position as it was before he arrived. His (apparently) first replacement, Steve DeMarco (an unseen character), is much more controversial, embroiling the station in scandal and committing a major FCC violation that leads to his firing (and Carlson's arrest) the day before the new series begins. By the time of the later series, the program director's chair is filled by Donovan Aderhold (played by Mykelti Williamson), who disappears in the penultimate episode when he leaves the station, attempts to return, but has his plane disappear. The position is empty in the series finale. Andy Travis was one of two main cast members from the original series, along with Bailey Quarters, that never appeared in the new series. Sandy had grown frustrated that the role had typecast him as a handsome but lightweight leading man and had left television shortly after the original series ended in order to work on stage.

== Personal life ==
In the first-season episode "Love Returns", Travis is very tempted to leave WKRP. An old flame, now a very successful country and western singer (played by It's a Living star Barrie Youngfellow), shows up and rekindles old feelings. She offers him a job with her entourage, but he reluctantly turns it down. During the remainder of the show's run, Andy occasionally refers to having girlfriends and dates, and even uses Mr. Carlson's office to impress an attractive coat-check girl during a business party, but otherwise he is not actually seen actively pursuing a love interest.

Andy is not immune to the charms of his female co-workers. After Andy is knocked unconscious during a tornado, Jennifer Marlowe begins giving him mouth-to-mouth resuscitation, which a delirious Andy soon attempts to turn into a passionate kiss. Similarly, when reprimanding Bailey Quarters for crafting a fake news story that was subsequently read on-air, he informs her that should it ever happen again, she will be "the best-looking reporter on the unemployment line" (Bailey's response in turn is non-verbal, but does indicate that she is extremely flattered by the compliment). In the episode "Filthy Pictures", Bailey uses Andy's obvious discomfort at being asked to pose in a bathing suit (for a charity photoshoot) to gently mock male chauvinist attitudes, greeting him with "Hey, baby" and calling him "beefcake". However, Andy does get his own back when Bailey dresses stylishly in purple and pretends to be a former nude pinup model (in order to get nude photos of Jennifer back from a sleazy photographer); when she returns to the station after the successful ruse, Andy greets her by saying, "Hey, baby...purple's my favorite color." He then begins chasing her around the station.

== Casting ==
Hugh Wilson, the creator and showrunner of WKRP, originally wanted to offer the part of Andy to David Letterman. However, MTM decided to cast Letterman in another show, Mary Tyler Moore's comedy-variety show Mary (which was canceled after only three weeks). Several other actors were considered for the part, including Ross Bickell (who would recommend his then-wife Loni Anderson for the part of Jennifer Marlowe), but CBS executives decided that Sandy was the best choice. Sandy recalled that his audition involved performing a scene with Gordon Jump, who had already been cast as Arthur Carlson; both Jump and Sandy were originally from Dayton, Ohio, and Jump was already familiar with Sandy—he had edited a publication in which a younger Sandy had been highlighted as a promising youth. Years after the series ended, Sandy was offered the audition reel that featured the other performers who auditioned for the part; upon reviewing it, he was glad he got the part because he felt his audition was the best, an assessment that Jump shared.
