= Film at 11 =

Idiom

"Film at 11" or "Pictures at 11" is a US idiom from television news broadcasting, in which viewers are informed that footage of a breaking news story will be screened later that day. The word "film" in the phrase dates back to the early decades of TV news when footage was regularly recorded on film. 11 PM is the traditional time for late evening local news broadcasts in the Eastern and Pacific time zones of the United States, while the late evening news comes at 10 PM in the middle time zones (Mountain and Central).

== History ==
Television news gathering originally involved crews using 16 mm film (or, at lower-budget stations, Super 8 mm film) that would be processed at the station and had to be edited before it could be aired. The time taken for this process meant that film of an early evening event would only be available in time for the late newscast.

The purpose of these "Film at 11" promotions was to attract viewers and increase the program's ratings. However, news broadcasts were not counted in ratings during the time 16mm film was used in newsgathering and hence promotions typically took the form of "newsflashes" or "special reports" that conveyed the facts of the story.

The phrase entered popular culture in the 1970s, often describing ordinary or mundane events with an implication that the said events were being overly sensationalized, or as a short-hand expression akin to "tell you later." The phrase was used in many TV shows and movies from the 1960s through the 1980s, for instance The Kentucky Fried Movie (1977), WKRP in Cincinnati (1978), and Short Circuit (1986).

Whether or not he is to be credited with originating the phrase, in West Coast local news the phrase is commonly attributed to Jerry Dunphy during his time with KABC-TV in Los Angeles.

The phrase became obsolete with the advent of videotape as the medium of choice for news reporting, which made playing back news stories instantaneous.

== See also ==
- Do you know where your children are?
- Pictures at Eleven, a Robert Plant album named for the phrase
- "Fighting the frizzies, at 11" - a similar phrase popularized by the Star Wars Holiday Special
