= Skinny Bobby Harper =

American DJ (1939–2003)

Robert Blake Harper (1939 – July 22, 2003) was a Canadian-born radio and video DJ.

== Radio ==
Harper debuted on the air in Shenandoah, Iowa, where he worked at a radio station to help to pay his college expenses. Much of his job involved playing recorded religious programs.

First making it big in Cincinnati, Ohio, at WSAI (AM) and in Kansas City, Missouri, at WDAF, Harper moved to Atlanta, Georgia, in the late 1960s and joined the staff of WQXI radio. WKRP in Cincinnati writer Bill Dial worked with Harper at WQXI and used him as the inspiration for the sitcom's off-the-wall character Dr. Johnny Fever, played by Howard Hesseman.

In June 1965, Harper was fired from WSAI after he was involved in legal problems including three speeding convictions in 14 months and convictions for disorderly conduct. WSAI's owners also fired the station's general manager, who had allowed Harper to continue working up to that point.

While in Atlanta, Harper also worked for seven other radio stations, including WIIN, WPLO, WGST, WLTA, WKLS, WAKY and WSB. Born and raised in the Canadian province of Saskatchewan, Harper was a die-hard hockey fan and served as a color commentator for Atlanta Flames radio and television broadcasts.

An article in The Atlanta Constitution in 1975 described Harper as the "one-time rascal of early morning repartee for WIIN radio" and said that he was "once known as The King of Bad Taste". In his early years on WIIN, Harper was known for editorializing as he ranted against the Vietnam War and President Richard Nixon. He also made unexpected telephone calls to the White House and J. Edgar Hoover, as well as others.

== Television ==
Harper left WAKY at the end of January 1970 to return to Atlanta — to work in television, at WTCG, rather than in radio. An article in The Courier-Journal reported that Harper "told about a TV show, as yet unnamed, patterned after a Top 40 radio operation, designed to run twice a week." The program, Now Explosion, ran from noon each Saturday until 2 a.m. Sunday and from noon each Sunday until 3 a.m. Monday. Harper and Bob Todd were the hosts.

Later in 1970, a different version of the program, The Now Explosion! was broadcast on WPIX-TV in New York City. It premiered on June 20 with a 4:30-6 p.m. broadcast followed by a different episode that night from 11 o'clock to 2 a.m. Harper was described in an article in the New York Daily News as "the off-camera announcer". The programs were recorded in Fort Lauderdale, Florida.

In 1971, Harper teamed with Freddie Miller on The Miller-Harper Sports Report on WTCG-TV in Atlanta.

== Other activities ==
After being released from WSB in 1991, Harper stayed in Atlanta but left radio, going to work in the corporate communications office of Delta Air Lines. He went on to work for MARTA and Underground Atlanta before retiring.

== Death ==
Harper died on July 22, 2003, in Atlanta from lung cancer.
