= Herb Tarlek =

Character on the television situation comedy WKRP in Cincinnati

- WKRP in Cincinnati character
- Portrayed by: Frank Bonner

In-universe information
- Gender: Male
- Occupation: sales manager
- Family: Herbert Tarlek Sr (father); A brother
- Spouse: Lucille Tarlek
- Children: Bunny Tarlek (daughter); Herb Tarlek III (son)
- Nationality: American

Herbert Ruggles Tarlek, Jr. is a character on the television situation comedy WKRP in Cincinnati (1978–1982). He was played by actor Frank Bonner, who reprised the role for the sequel series The New WKRP in Cincinnati.

== Sales manager not so extraordinaire ==
Herb is the sales manager at radio station WKRP, having been with the station since 1966. The station's poor performance prevents Tarlek from securing deals with major advertising agencies (as it was, even if the station were successful, the agency employees personally loathed Tarlek anyway). Tarlek is able to keep the station financially solvent through the subprime advertising market, courting unconventional advertisers (often this involved airing ads from companies that catered to a very old demographic, such as Shady Hills Rest Home, Gone With the Wind Estates, and Ferryman Funeral Homes). He also was not beneath recruiting less reputable advertisers to buy airtime on WKRP, such as Dave Wickerman, whose "diet pills" turned out to be a legalized form of speed. Herb's most reliable advertising client is Red Wigglers (the "Cadillac of Worms"), though the owner of Red Wigglers, Harvey Green, pulled his commercials off WKRP after the Religious Right threatened a boycott of the station's advertisers ("a lot of religious people fish"). Several episodes of the series involve Tarlek and Andy Travis personally courting companies to advertise on the station.

Herb's most effective talent is knowing how to collect money from deadbeat clients, often by blackmailing them. He admits to program director Andy Travis that it took time to develop that skill, saying of one client: "He did that to me [failed to pay up] twenty times. Then I got smart." Herb also repeats this skill in The New WKRP in Cincinnati, where he bails rookie salesman Arthur Carlson, Jr. out of a ticket trade scam for a freak show operator. Though the contract legally binds the station to air the show's ads, Herb is released from the contract after he threatens to take legal action against the promoter, who has habitually left a string of unpaid debts to other radio stations.

Herb is best known for his atrocious taste in clothes. He always wears a white belt and white shoes; most of his suits are made of polyester and are covered in loud plaid patterns. He claims to get his suits in a golf pro shop across the river in Northern Kentucky; no one else makes his kind of clothes anymore due to anti-pollution laws. While Herb's co-workers mock his fashion sense ("Somewhere there's a Volkswagen without seat covers"), Herb claims that his suits put his clients at ease, conveying the message "trust me, sign my deal! I know what I'm doing." He is proven right in the episode "Changes", when he switches over to a tasteful wardrobe; his lowbrow clients don't trust someone with such a highbrow wardrobe, and Herb quickly returns to his old way of dressing. He is one of the few cast members to embrace disco; when Johnny Fever transmogrifies into the smarmy, disco-loving Rip Tide, Herb and Rip become fast friends.

Herb prefers personal luxury cars for what he believes is necessary for a job of his caliber. In the episode "Baby If You've Ever Wondered", he suggests an across-the-board raise (which he calculates by taking away Carlson's share of the station sales commissions). When he figures out the final sum, he tosses the calculator on his desk, declaring "Oh yes, we are definitely talking Cordoba!" This is realized in the subsequent episode "Real Families", where his car is indeed revealed to be a 1980 Chrysler Cordoba.

Herb sometimes tries to make money by doing other things on the side, like selling life insurance or running a numbers racket. He also collects kickbacks from his advertising clients and from the disc jockeys (for getting them endorsements and other outside work); in the pilot he boasts that "they don't call me 'Mr. Kickback' for nothing."

Herb often uses the phrase "Hokay, fine" ("OK, fine") when acknowledging news or decisions that are not wholly to his liking. His other catch phrase could be said to be "I knew that," said softly and always after a pause, stemming from mild embarrassment when someone states something obvious to everyone else in the room.

At WKRP, Herb is considered a troublemaker and "general jackass" by his co-workers, but they all have a certain grudging affection for him. Jennifer Marlowe intervenes on Herb's behalf on several occasions, both in personal matters (such as trying to convince Herb's wife to accept him back during a brief separation) and in his professional foul-ups (such as trying to save Herb's job by attempting to deceive a dissatisfied client, who ultimately turned out to be sympathetic). Herb is so frequently late that he habitually apologizes when entering a room, "Sorry I'm late, unless I'm not." Venus Flytrap also saved Herb's job on one occasion; a jealous Herb had lied about a job offer he received, hoping to get the same response Venus got when he received an actual job offer. Venus used a counter-offer from Andy to get Herb his job back, telling Andy they were a "package deal" (and "soul brothers").

For all of his flaws, Herb also shows flashes of integrity and ingenuity. When he discovered that a diet pill he has sold advertising space for had resulted in a teenager being hospitalized, he immediately went on the air to denounce the product and announce that the station would no longer run their ads. In another instance, when Carlson pulled out of a planned series of musical ads for a funeral home, Herb remembered that the station still owned the rights to the jingle and he re-wrote the lyrics to fit an ad campaign for a local tire store.

== Personal life ==
Herb is married to Lucille (Edie McClurg), a slightly overweight and feisty brunette with a high-pitched voice, and has two children: Bunny, a smart girl with an interest in animals and the environment, and Herb III, a shy boy who likes to play with dolls, much to Herb's chagrin. Herb mentions that a large number of Lucille's relatives visit at Christmas, and stay in their house.

In the episode "Real Families", Herb's family is profiled on a network TV reality show. Herb tries to convey the impression that he is a hard working, clean-living all-American guy, but as the episode goes on, the TV hosts systematically expose his incompetence as a worker and as a family man. At the end, Herb throws the camera crew out of his house (and gives Herb III back his doll), but still remains so desperate to be on television that he accepts an invitation to fly out with his family to Hollywood and meet the hosts.

In "Never Leave Me, Lucille", Herb and Lucille briefly split up, while in "Frog Story", he causes the death of his daughter's pet frog by accidentally spray-painting it. When asked (in "Real Families") what she sees in Herb, Lucille smiles and replies "he's got a great body."

Herb's widowed father, Herbert R. Tarlek Sr. (Bert Parks) was himself a traveling salesman, with a similar wardrobe and outlook on life to that of Herb. Herb's mother is said to have died circa 1976; a brother is briefly mentioned, but it is established only that this brother doesn't keep in touch with the family.

Herb's father is more charming than his son, and more successful at his trade, as proven when he sells an entire collection of knockoff Indian jewelry to Carlson in the episode "Herb's Dad". It is eventually revealed that Herb and his father came to an arrangement; his dad retired and went into the Shady Hills rest home, and in return Herb cut the rest home a deal for commercials on WKRP. However, Herb Sr. grew restless and went to see his son at the station. Initially fooling Herb into thinking he was dying, Herb Sr. eventually admits to his son that he still feels he has a few good traveling years in him (along with a blonde female nurse for company) and wants to go to California. Herb initially resisted his father's wishes (which also caused some resentment among Herb's co-workers, particularly Bailey and Jennifer who had been charmed by Herb Sr.), but eventually came around to his dad's way of thinking and even gave Herb Sr. $1000 for traveling money (which he earned by illegally raffling off his paycheck to other tenants in the Flimm Building).

Herb constantly hits on the station's receptionist, Jennifer Marlowe, and tells every man he meets that he and Jennifer are a couple (a fact he admits to her in the episode "Fire", when the two are trapped in an elevator during a fire). At Bailey Quarters' suggestion, Jennifer finally agrees to go on a date with him in the episode "Put Up or Shut Up", in order to call Herb's bluff, but becomes frightened when Herb enthusiastically accepts. Nonetheless, Bailey is later proven right as Herb becomes so nervous at even the remotest thought of his fantasies finally coming true that he begins to hyperventilate (an act he repeats in later episodes when under stress), as well as admitting to Jennifer that he feels guilty over the possibility of cheating on his wife. However, there were moments prior to this when Herb showed concern for Jennifer beyond her sexual appeal, such as when he tried to comfort her after a blow-up with her childhood sweetheart (in the episode "I Do, I Do...For Now").

Though he doesn't like to admit it publicly, he is faithful to Lucille; the closest he ever came to adultery was during the episode "Hotel Oceanview", where he got drunk and began kissing a woman he vaguely recognized from high school, but couldn't place...who turned out to be a man who had undergone sex reassignment surgery (when she informed Herb of this, Herb's initial response was to curl up in the fetal position, and then protest to everyone that "just because I kissed him, that doesn't make me gay.").

Herb also tends to drink too much, and at one point, his three-martini lunches with clients leads him to the brink of full-blown alcoholism. In the episode "Out to Lunch", Herb's reliance on alcohol to try to land customers causes him to blow a deal with a small record store, while he tries to lock down a deal with a representative from a large ad agency (Craig T. Nelson). Eventually, the rep admits that he was fired from the agency weeks ago; Herb realizes that due to his own inebriation, he was unable to see that the rep was just stringing him along for free food and drink. Despondent, Herb is eventually forced to face up to his issues by station manager Arthur Carlson, who convinces him to get the problem under control before it is too late.

He has a fondness for pornographic movies with titles like Kick Me, Kiss Me, and in one episode he sneaks out of the hospital (where he has been admitted for heart tests) to take Les Nessman to a theater where they show adult films in 3-D. He sometimes writes letters to Penthouse magazine, though they are never published. He is once arrested on a morals charge, though he maintains that "it's a complete lie—I don't even know the names of those girls!"

Out of his co-workers at the station, Herb tends to be the closest to Les Nessman. Les and Herb tend to have a love-hate relationship, as Herb routinely insults and derides Les. At one point, a jealous Herb tried to have Les' date with Jennifer for an awards banquet broken by manipulating Mr. Carlson, and at another time even goosed Les' mother, thinking she was Les in drag (as they strongly resembled each other), only to be confronted by an infuriated Les moments afterward. In turn, Les seriously injured Herb when pulling him along on a hang glider for a promotional stunt (Les had stopped at a stoplight, causing the glider to plummet to the ground). One time Herb actually loaned Les his speed boat only for Les to describe to Herb how the trailer hitch came apart..and sent the boat going down the highway; Les is so oblivious that he doesn't realize that the loss of his boat causes Herb anguish! However, Les and Herb have also shown signs of strong friendship. When Herb's wife threw him out, Les pleaded Herb's case to the others at the station so he could have a place to stay. In the episode "Les on a Ledge", when Les was considering suicide (due to rumors that he was homosexual) by jumping off a ledge outside Mr. Carlson's office, Herb eventually went out on the ledge himself to get Les to come back in (and ended up falling onto the firemen's nets several stories below, incurring yet another serious injury). Les summed up their relationship by saying "I hate him, but he is my best friend."

== Behind the scenes ==
The writers of WKRP did many episodes focusing on Herb; in the third season of the series, no fewer than six of the 22 episodes were Herb stories. One writer, PJ Torokvei, said that horribly flawed characters like Herb were more interesting to write for than a more self-assured character like Jennifer Marlowe. Another staff writer, Steven Kampmann, recalled that he liked writing for Herb because he was one of the few characters on the show with a wife and family, which added more dimensions to his character.

Frank Bonner directed six episodes of the series.

The role of Herb Tarlek was originally offered to the character actor Rod McCary, but he turned it down to appear in another series.

It is unknown why the show's writers gave him the surname "Tarlek", which is not a known surname in any ethnicity or culture (the "ek" suffix is most commonly associated with Czech or Bohemian ancestry).

== Cultural references ==
Herb is still identified, more than three decades after WKRP's initial run ended, as the stereotype for "unprofessional, bribe-taking desperate salespeople" with sales professionals being advised not to wear plaid sports coats so as to avoid being associated in customers' minds with the untrustworthy Mr. Tarlek. The Canadian indie rock band Rheostatics released the song "The Tarleks" on their 2004 album 2067, loosely based on the character. Bonner appears in the video as a large group of Herb Tarleks which come out of a landed UFO and swarm the city.
