= Richard Sanders (actor) =

American actor (born 1940)

- Born: August 23, 1940 (age 86)
- Occupations: Actor; screenwriter
- Years active: 1971–2006
- Known for: WKRP in Cincinnati

Richard Sanders (born August 23, 1940) is a retired American actor and screenwriter. He played quirky news anchorman Les Nessman on the CBS sitcom WKRP in Cincinnati (1978–1982). Most of his acting career has been on television.

== Career ==
Sanders became known for his role as Les Nessman on the CBS sitcom WKRP in Cincinnati from 1978 to 1982. He joined Gordon Jump and Frank Bonner in reprising his original WKRP role on The New WKRP in Cincinnati in the early 1990s. He has guest-appeared on other television shows, including Lou Grant, Kojak, The Rockford Files, Alice, Coach, Newhart, Murder, She Wrote, Who's the Boss?, ALF, Growing Pains, Designing Women, and Married... with Children, and has also acted in the mini-series Roots: The Next Generations, the animated series Inhumanoids, the horror film Lovers Lane, and the Robert De Niro/Cuba Gooding Jr. film Men of Honor.

Besides being an actor, Sanders is a screenwriter, having written, among other works, several episodes of WKRP in Cincinnati. In 1993, he starred in the computer game Day of the Tentacle as the voice of Bernard Bernoulli.

== Personal life ==
Sanders resides in Woodinville, Washington.

== Filmography ==
=== Film ===
Year	Title	Role	Notes
1977	Billy Jack Goes to Washington	Jerry	
1980	The Nude Bomb	German Delegate	
1983	Valley Girl	Drivers' Ed Teacher	
1991	Neon City	Dickie Devine	
1994	The Beans of Egypt, Maine	Lee, Earlene's Father	
1997	Black Circle Boys	Mr. Dunkel	
1999	Anoosh of the Airways	Burton Lloydhammer	
1999	Lovers Lane	Dr. Jack Grefe	
2000	Men of Honor	Donny Moor, The Bartender	
2000	Nowheresville	Duane	
2006	Expiration Date	Municipal Cemetery Administrator	

=== Television ===
Year	Title	Role	Notes
1971	They've Killed President Lincoln!	Dr. Leale	Television film
1974	Lincoln: Trial by Fire	Minister John Adams	Television film
1974	The Doctors	The Bartender	4 episodes
1976	Midway	Navy pilot (uncredited)	TV version
1977	McCloud	Matt Clayton	Episode: "London Bridges"
1977	Alexander: The Other Side of Dawn	Travis	Television film
1977	Good Against Evil	The Doctor	Television film
1977	Lou Grant	Richard T. Harvey	Episode: "Hostages"
1977	Barnaby Jones	Joe Keller	Episode: "The Wife Beater"
1977	Kojak	Drunk	Episode: "A Strange Kind of Love"
1977	Rafferty	Reverend Campbell	Episode: "The Wild Child"
1977	The Rockford Files	Samuel Romney	Episode: "The Mayor's Committee from Deer Lick Falls"
1978	Ruby and Oswald	FBI Agent Kelley	Television film
1978	Keefer	Bemmel	Television film
1978	The Gypsy Warriors	German Scientist	Television film
1978	Bud and Lou	The Doctor	Television film
1978–1982	WKRP in Cincinnati	Les Nessman	88 episodes
1979	Roots: The Next Generations	Captain	Episode: "Part III (1914–1918)"
1979	Ike	Correspondant	Episode: "Part II"
1979	Hollywood Squares	Himself	https://www.youtube.com/watch?v=TbPCfF54Yak
1979	Diary of a Teenage Hitchhiker	Mr. Fogarty	Television film
1980	Trouble in High Timber Country	Lester	Television film
1980	Fantasy Island	The Race Track Announcer	2 episodes
1982	ABC Weekend Special	Mr. Lester Little	Episode: "The Joke's on Mr. Little"
1982	Gloria	Barry Farnum	Episode: "The Taxman Cometh"
1983	It Takes Two	Arthur Frain	Episode: "Anniversary"
1983	The Invisible Woman	Orville	Television film
1983	Alice	Arnold	Episode: "Alice's Blind Date"
1983	Goodnight, Beantown	Chester	Episode: "Peace on Earth"
1984	Simon & Simon	Ed Laughlin	Episode: "The Wrong Stuff"
1984	Newhart	Cecil Breech	Episode: "Leave It to the Beavers"
1984–1985	Spencer	Benjamin Beanley	13 episodes
1984-1987	Murder, She Wrote	Gerald Richards, Arnold Megrim	2 episodes
1985	Berrenger's	Frank Chapman	8 episodes
1985	Who's the Boss?	Bob Wormser	2 episodes
1986	Riptide	Pierce Fenner	Episode: "A Matter of Policy"
1986	Knots Landing	Harry Nold	Episode: "The Legacy"
1986	ALF	Hogarth	Episode: "Pennsylvania 6-5000"
1986	Inhumanoids	Dr. Derek Bright	Voice, 8 episodes
1986-1989	Growing Pains	Dr. Rosenfeld, Luther	2 episodes
1987	Easy Street	Ravenkeep	Episode: "The Mad Gardener"
1987	Nothing in Common	Dooley	Episode: "Gone Fishing"
1987	Married... with Children	Mr. Conner	Episode: "Sixteen Years and What Do You Get"
1987–1988	You Can't Take It with You	Paul Sycamore	4 episodes
1988	The Law & Harry McGraw	Burton Rumley	Episode: "Beware the Ides of May"
1988	Duet	Bob	Episode: "Funny Valentine"
1988	Perry Mason: The Case of the Avenging Ace	Chester Lackberry	Television film
1989	Night Court	City Auditor Clark Edwards	2 episodes
1989	The Magical World of Disney	Dr. Dark	Episode: "The Absent-Minded Professor: Trading Places"
1990	227	Dean Thurston	Episode: "Nightmare on 227"
1990	Charles in Charge	Professor Smalley	Episode: "Let's Quake a Deal"
1990	Coach	Warren Graustark	Episode: "The Break-Up"
1990	Designing Women	Dr. Elliot Newhouse, Elmer Peace	2 episodes
1990	Gravedale High	Ben Franklin	Episode: "Goodbye Gravedale"
1991–1993	The New WKRP in Cincinnati	Les Nessman	46 episodes
1995	Simon & Simon: In Trouble Again	Dr. Budwig	Television film
1997	Unhappily Ever After	Mr. Peabody	Episode: "Teacher of the Year"
1999	Batman Beyond	Mr. Deakins	Voice, episode: "Spellbound"
2000	The John Report with Bob	Bob's Dad	Episode #1.2
2001	The Fugitive	Judge	Episode: "And in That Darkness"
2002	Rose Red	Mr. Stanton	2 episodes
