= Dr. Johnny Fever =

Character on the television sitcom WKRP in Cincinnati

- WKRP in Cincinnati character
- Johnny Fever unsuccessfully flirts with receptionist Jennifer Marlowe (Loni Anderson)
- Portrayed by: Howard Hesseman

In-universe information
- Gender: Male
- Occupation: Disc jockey
- Family: Carrie Caravella (mother)
- Spouses: Paula (divorced); Another ex-wife
- Children: Laurie Caravella
- Relatives: George (uncle); Phoebe (aunt)
- Nationality: American

Dr. Johnny Fever is a fictional character on the American television sitcom WKRP in Cincinnati. He was inspired by Skinny Bobby Harper, who previously had been a DJ in Atlanta and on Cincinnati's Top 40 station WSAI. The character was portrayed by Howard Hesseman.

== Before and after the format change ==
Johnny Fever, whose real name is John Caravella, grew up in a broken home. His relationship with his father was poor and his parents eventually separated when he was still young. While he was still a child, a tornado struck the mobile home community where he and his mother were living, leaving him with a near-pathological fear of windstorms. He was a hippie in the 1960s, 10 to 12 years before the show's timeframe. Johnny began working his way up in the radio business and became a highly popular and successful DJ. At the height of his career, he was a star at a major station in Los Angeles, where he worked under the name "Johnny Sunshine" and did a popular show called "Johnny Sunshine, Boss Jock" (thus implying the station was "Boss Radio" originator KHJ). After he said the word "booger" on the air, he was fired with a year left on his contract. He sued the station for wrongful dismissal and received a large cash settlement after a few years. After being forced out of L.A. his career took a nosedive. For several years he led a nomadic existence, going from town to town taking a series of unsatisfying and low-paying jobs at low-rated stations including a job hosting a garden show in Amarillo. He has used many on-air names, including Johnny Duke, Johnny Style, Johnny Cool, Johnny Midnight, and even Heavy Early. (Most of these names appear on the side of Johnny's coffee cup.) He finally hit "rock bottom," in his own words, when he landed in Cincinnati at the worst radio station in town, WKRP, the only station that would hire him, by 1976. He found himself hosting a "beautiful music" show in the morning, so obviously bored with the music that he didn't even bother to make up a new name or on-air persona.

When Andy Travis takes over as program director of WKRP and abruptly changes the format to rock n' roll, Johnny is initially doubtful that he can succeed as the morning man in the new format; conscious of his own age, Johnny advises Andy to find someone "about fifteen years younger," but Andy insists that he can handle it—-and even gives him permission to say "booger" on the air. When he gets on the air the first time after the format change, Johnny comes alive, signaling the change with a loud drag on the playing record (a fictional black gospel cover of "(You're) Having My Baby" by the Hallelujah Tabernacle Choir), after literally folding the record album on the other turntable in half. He immediately adopts the new, hyper-excited persona of "Dr. Johnny Fever," by playing the first record ("Queen of the Forest" by Ted Nugent), and telling his listeners:

All right, Cincinnati, it is time for this town to get down! You've got Johnny—Doctor Johnny Fever, and I am burnin' up in here! Whoa! Whoo! We all in critical condition, babies, but you can tell me where it hurts, because I got the healing prescription here from the big 'KRP musical medicine cabinet. Now I am talking about your 50,000 watt intensive care unit, babies! So just sit right down, relax, open your ears real wide and say, "Give it to me straight, Doctor. I can take it!"

He then starts the station's first rock record, before donning his sunglasses and then triumphantly saying, "I almost forgot, fellow babies: BOOGER!"

On the DVD audio commentary track for this episode, series creator Hugh Wilson credits Hesseman for largely improvising this entire speech.

== On-air style ==
The "Doctor" has a confident, conversational style on air, although he sometimes struggles with anxiety. He once gives Bailey Quarters, an aspiring newswoman, this sage advice: "Talk into the microphone as if you were talking to your best friend." Later, in that same episode ("Mike Fright"), he struggles to take his own advice.

Never a fan of disco, the new music fad of the era, he is a lover of rock and roll, although he feels he is getting too old to be a DJ in the genre (aside from two episodes on which he adopts a disco persona for a high-paying television job—see below). Tunes like "Hey Jude" are used for bathroom breaks or extended chats with friends.

Though the format of WKRP is Top 40, Johnny frequently refuses to play any songs off the station playlist, choosing instead to highlight album-oriented rock and old R&B favorites on his own show. A consultant hired by Mrs. Carlson at one point describes Johnny as being "stuck in 1962". Andy frequently pleads with Johnny to stick to the playlist, to play just one disco song, only to have Johnny threaten to "throw himself in front of Donna Summer's tour bus". Andy actually goes into a state of hysteria when he hears Johnny playing "The Long Run" by The Eagles: "That's a hit! He's playing a hit!"

Fever's unorthodox choice of music pays off as the series goes on, and by the final episode he has become the number-one morning DJ in the city. Johnny's views towards his music and his audience were perhaps best summed up when, picking a record, he exclaims "Sacred music...B.B. King!" Once, during a bomb threat, he remarked "If I die, who will teach the children about Bo Diddley?"

Herb Tarlek, the account executive, can never land the big accounts. As a result, Fever and the other DJs on WKRP have to do voiceovers (done live in that era) for spots for funeral homes and Red Wigglers, the "Cadillac" of worms (to which Fever adds the tag line "available at finer worm stores everywhere!"). However, Johnny has his scruples, as when he walks out of a recording session for sports aids when he realized his dialogue is laced with euphemisms for dangerous drug effects. While it is strongly implied that Johnny is a frequent user of marijuana, he doesn't go in for harder drugs, and leads a campaign to shut down a businessman who is trying to sell speed to teenagers. He also discovers his brief successor, Doug Winner (Philip Charles MacKenzie) has been accepting cocaine for airplay under a payola scheme with a sleazy record promoter. Johnny doesn't rat Doug out (instead he tells Mr. Carlson that it's "foot powder"), but cautions him about the dangers of cocaine abuse, knowing he'll eventually hang himself with his own noose, which subsequently happens and Johnny gets his old job back.

== Personal life ==
Johnny's early life is not explored in the original show, apart from a few brief references; he mentioned he lived in a trailer park (which was at least on one occasion hit by a tornado), and that he didn't get along with his father. However, in the sequel series The New WKRP In Cincinnati, it is established that Johnny never knew his father (which clashes slightly with the continuity from the original series, where he had a poor relationship with his father, but did at least know him); his mother, Carrie, was a singer who recorded with Buddy Rich. He was left in the care of his straightlaced Uncle George (a minister) and Aunt Phoebe in Indiana, and chafed at their restrictive rules, although he knew his uncle and aunt loved him. He eventually left home at 17.

Johnny's persona is generally one of an aging burnt out ex-hippie. After spending most of his life in a nomadic existence "up and down the dial", WKRP settles Johnny down and establishes a relatively stable ensemble of friends and associates for him. Although the tradeoff is a cramped apartment and low pay, this arrangement doesn't seem to overly concern him much (at one point he describes himself as "a 40-year-old man who lives like a college student"). He is also believed to have been incarcerated at least twice; once in Mexico, where he says he was involved in a "minor misunderstanding with 145 Mexican cops," and another time in New Jersey when he indicated that he, "Went through Princeton....It was in a car....A police car actually! Very, very educational." He was a hippie in the 1960s, 10–12 years before the show's time frame. It is implied that he smokes marijuana by his overall character, and occasional references to drug culture (e.g. Mr. Carlson once dismissed a business as a front for selling drug paraphernalia, and Johnny immediately asked where it was). In the first-season episode, "Fish Story", he shows a near superhuman resistance to the effects of alcohol, apparently building up a high tolerance after years of heavy drinking. He is often seen wearing a Black Death Malt Liquor T-shirt, designed by Rip Off Press underground comic artist Dave Sheridan.

He has been married twice, with both of his ex-wives collecting alimony. This places Johnny in a constant state of poverty, despite his $17,500 annual salary ($86,400 today) at WKRP (season 1 "Goodbye, Johnny"), albeit placing him well behind the $24,000 salary ($118,500 today) of receptionist Jennifer Marlowe (season 1 "Mama's Review"). After his first divorce, he lived for two years with a woman named Buffy (Julie Payne); Buffy later tracked him down in Cincinnati, and threatened to sue him for a portion of his income.

Johnny also has a college-age daughter, Laurie (Patrie Allen), who visits him in season two's "The Doctor's Daughter" and briefly moves in with him. He later (season three's "Three Days of the Condo") gives his daughter the majority of his legal settlement – roughly one year's salary – from the Los Angeles station that fired him for saying "booger". There is some suggestion in one episode that he might still be in love with Laurie's mother, his first wife, Paula (Ruth Silveira), though they agree that their relationship is over, and Paula marries another man (Hamilton Camp) (season three's "Till Debt Do Us Part"). Johnny's second wife never makes an appearance. Their parting was not as amicable: she tried to kill Johnny with a Ronco Veg-O-Matic. At the end of an episode of The New WKRP in Cincinnati, Johnny implies to WKRP's new morning host Razor D (French Stewart) that he may be his illegitimate father, having met his mother at a Grateful Dead concert near the speakers.

Beginning in the second season, he becomes on and off romantically involved with fellow employee, Bailey Quarters. Though the staff is usually indifferent, the rumor mills begin humming when Bailey invites Johnny to stay at her apartment while his apartment is being fumigated (he claims it's for lizards). Though Johnny is flattered by the attention at first, he quickly tires of the leering gestures from some of the male staffers and tells Andy that the rumors of him and Bailey shacking up aren't true, and expresses his dissatisfaction of the treatment Bailey has been getting. At another point later in the series, Bailey and Johnny are again implied to be, if not an item, at least very close when Bailey asks Johnny "if I get some cutoffs, want to go with me?", and Johnny's non-verbal reaction clearly indicates they have an intense attraction to each other. In the season three episode "Till Debt Do Us Part", Bailey accepts Johnny's offer to join him on a Caribbean vacation (later cancelled by Herb's actions), though she does say she expects separate rooms. The series left their relationship implied but ambiguous.

Out of all the staff, Johnny appears to be the closest to fellow DJ Venus Flytrap, to the point where Venus gives him financial advice, bets on horses and football games with him, and even knows which seedy bars Johnny spends time at (for his part, Venus once claimed that he came to WKRP specifically "to work with the Doctor").

In the second season episode, "God Talks to Johnny", after hearing a voice he believes to be God Himself, Johnny (and almost everyone else) is convinced he's going crazy; Johnny mentions that the voice said, "I love you, I want you to seek knowledge, and (though he's not certain) I want you to be a golf pro!" When Johnny admits himself into a hospital late at night, he is met by Mr. Carlson, a devoted Christian, who tells Johnny that there is nothing wrong with hearing God's voice, but doubted it was God, saying, "If God had something He wanted to say, you'd hear it."

Johnny has also proven to be a shrewd judge of character. Case in point, in the series finale, "Up And Down The Dial", the latest ratings book lists Johnny as the #1 morning DJ in the Cincinnati market with the station itself now at #6 overall. But Mrs. Carlson suddenly decides to change the station's format from Top 40 to an all-news format. Slightly inebriated from the office party, Johnny confronts Mrs. Carlson at her home, at which point she admits to Johnny that WKRP was meant to be a liability to her business empire for tax write-off purposes; the surprise format change was meant to undo the station's unexpected affluence. Incredulous at her hypocrisy and callous manipulation ("You are telling your own son that you want him to be the general manager of the number one station in the market, and you'd be happier if it was sixteenth! How do you think he’d feel if he knew?”), Johnny threatens blackmail by telling Mr. Carlson her true intentions behind the format change, but Mrs. Carlson undercuts Johnny and instead tells Arthur that WKRP can keep the rock format.

== Other jobs ==
In an early episode, Johnny's new persona and his immediate popularity earn him a job offer from another station in Los Angeles with the biggest competitor of the station that fired him. His co-workers at WKRP throw him a party where they try to convince him not to leave; he admits how much he loves and cares about the people he works with. But in a reversal of sitcom conventionality, Johnny actually takes the L.A. job, but in "Johnny Returns", he is almost instantly fired for saying "jive-ass" on the air.

Later in his WKRP career, Johnny Fever is approached by a female television producer (Mary Frann) to be a TV DJ for her disco program Gotta Dance. "Rip Tide," Johnny's TV persona, is money-hungry, disco-loving, chummy with Herb Tarlek, and has a very different voice and personality. In the two-part episode "Dr. Fever and Mr. Tide," Johnny loses control of his personality when his alter-ego takes over while on the radio. He seems to be totally taken over by the Rip Tide persona until Andy Travis decides he would rather have Rip Tide as his morning DJ (causing Johnny to have an existential crisis) and Jennifer Marlowe disowns the sleazy Rip persona. Facing his demons, Johnny, as Rip, goes on TV and defames the industry with accusations of payola and using casting couches, then flips the music to Little Richard, killing off Rip Tide for good.

Dr. Johnny Fever never leaves the WKRP "family" of employees for the duration of the original series, but in the New WKRP in Cincinnati he has moved on to at least two more stations. He admits that the Cincinnati job is a good situation for him, but does occasionally wonder about what he is missing elsewhere by staying. He does return to WKRP for two two-part episodes in Season 1; then, late in the second season, he steps in as temporary overnight DJ when the station's longstanding and never-seen jock, Moss Steiger, dies. Johnny gets a full send-off near the end of the new series when he decides to return to Los Angeles.

== Casting ==
The role of Dr. Johnny Fever was originally intended for Richard Libertini, but he became unavailable. Howard Hesseman was known to WKRP's production company, MTM Enterprises, from his recurring guest role as Mr. Plager on MTM's The Bob Newhart Show. He was originally considered for the role of Herb Tarlek, but when he read the pilot script, he decided that Johnny was the part he really wanted. He was particularly suited for the part because he had actually been a disc jockey at one time, and he brought some of his experience to the character of Johnny -- including picking most of the songs that Johnny played on the show. Also, Hesseman had played wacky hippies before in Dragnet and in the film Billy Jack. Hesseman was also cast as a DJ in the second season, first episode of the 1975 TV show Switch titled "Pirates of Tin Pan Alley".
