= Frank Bonner =

American actor and director (1942–2021)

- Publicity photo of Bonner
- Born: Frank Woodrow Boers Jr. February 28, 1942; Little Rock, Arkansas, US
- Died: June 16, 2021 (aged 79); Laguna Niguel, California, US
- Occupations: Actor; director
- Years active: 1970–2014
- Known for: WKRP in Cincinnati
- Spouses: Sharon Gray (m. 1966; div. 1971); Mary A. Rings (m. 1972; div. 1975); Lillian Garrett-Groag (m. 1977; div. 1980); Catherin M. Sherwood (m. 1981, divorced); Gayle Hardage (m. 2006)
- Children: 5

Frank Woodrow Boers Jr. (February 28, 1942 – June 16, 2021) was an American actor and television director. He is best known for his role as sales manager Herb Tarlek on the television sitcom WKRP in Cincinnati.

== Early life ==
Bonner was born in Little Rock, Arkansas, to Grace Marie "Mamie" (née Dobbins) Boers Delahoussay, a singer, and Frank Woodrow Boers, a saxophonist. He was raised in Malvern, Arkansas.

== Career ==
Bonner began acting in the experimental 1967 independent film The Equinox ... A Journey into the Unknown, which was reshot and re-edited as the 1970 cult classic Equinox (in which he is credited as Frank Boers Jr.).

He later had several small roles in movies and on television, including Mannix, Emergency!, and Love, American Style. In 1978 he joined the cast of WKRP in Cincinnati, finding his signature role as Herb Tarlek, the crass and ineffectual station advertising sales agent, noted for his garish plaid suits and white shoes.

Bonner appeared as a guest star in two episodes of the sitcom Night Court in the 1980s. He had a supporting role as Detective Mooney in the short-lived Disney action series Sidekicks (1986–87). From 1988 to 1990, Bonner played the role of Father Hargis, headmaster of the fictional St. Augustine's Academy, on the TV show Just the Ten of Us, which was a spin-off of Growing Pains. He also appeared in one of the early episodes of the television show Newhart. He reprised the role of Herb Tarlek in the 1991 spinoff The New WKRP in Cincinnati and in a 2004 rock video for Canadian indie rock band Rheostatics (for the song "The Tarleks" from their album 2067.

After directing six episodes of WKRP in Cincinnati, he directed for other television shows in the 1980s and 1990s, including Who's the Boss?, Head of the Class (starring his WKRP alumni Howard Hesseman), Evening Shade, Newhart, and every episode of the NBC Saturday morning sitcom City Guys. Bonner appeared in five episodes of Saved by the Bell: The New Class and directed four episodes.

== Personal life and death ==
Bonner was married five times: to Sharon Gray (1966–1971); actress Mary Alice Rings (1972–1975); playwright Lillian Garrett-Groag (1977–1980); Catherine M. Sherwood (1981–? until their divorce); and Gayle Hardage, his former high school sweetheart (2006–2021; his death). He had five children: a daughter (Desiree Boers-Kort) with his first wife, Sharon Gray; three sons (Michael, Matthew, and Justin); and a stepdaughter, DeAndra Freed. Bonner also had seven grandchildren and a great-grandchild at the time of his death. Michael predeceased his father.

In 1979, Bonner was injured in a parasailing accident at the El Mirage Lake Off-Highway Vehicle Recreation Area, northeast of Los Angeles. He was approximately 20 feet (6.1 m) in the air—suspended under an ascendancy parachute pulled by a tow vehicle—when a sudden, unexpected gust of wind collapsed the chute, causing him to fall to the lake bed and suffer internal injuries and injuries to his back. Subsequently, he appeared on crutches in episodes of WKRP in Cincinnati (the season 2 episode "A Family Affair") and an All-Star Special episode of Family Feud.

Bonner died on June 16, 2021, aged 79, in Laguna Niguel, California, of complications from Lewy body dementia. Bonner was a resident of Beverly Hills, California.

== Filmography ==
=== As actor ===
Year	Title	Role	Notes
1970	Equinox	Jim Hudson	Feature film
1970	The Young Lawyers	Walt	Episode: "Where's Aaron"
1970	Nancy	Hank	Episode: "Boys' Night Out"
1971	Mannix	Hypnotized Man	Episode: "Catspaw"
1972	Nichols	Gruber	Episode: "About Jesse James"
1972	The Hoax	Clete Dempsey	Feature film
1973	Little Cigars	Gene (Hotel Bellman)	Feature film
1973	The F.B.I.	Johnson	Episode: "The Confession"
1973	Hawkins	1st Yankee	Episode: "Blood Feud"
1973	Emergency!	Walt	Episode: "Body Language"
1974	Love, American Style	Jerry	Segment: "Love and the Extra Job"
1974	Cannon	Allecino	Episode: "Kelly' Song"
1974	Fer-de-Lance	Compton	Television film
1975	Las Vegas Lady	Claude	Feature film
1975	Cannon	Bill	Episode: "The Victim"
1976	Police Woman	Donny's Father	Episode: "The Pawn Shop"
1977	Man from Atlantis	Bartender	Episode: "C.W. Hyde"
1978–1982	WKRP in Cincinnati	Herb Tarlek	Main role, 88 episodes
1979	Sex and the Single Parent	Peter	Television film
1981	The Love Boat	Dr. Jonathan Hunt	Episode: "Country Blues/Daddy's Little Girl/Jackpot"
1981	Fantasy Island	Jack Simon	Episode: "Romance Times Three/Night of the Tormented Soul"
1982	The Facts of Life Goes to Paris	Garth Kiley	Television film
1982	Gimme a Break!	Officer Baxter	Episode: "The Chief's Gay Evening"
1983	The Love Boat	Ben Phillips	Episode: "The Captain's Replacement/Sly as a Fox/Here Comes the Bride-Maybe"
1984	Newhart	Mr. Pack	Episode: "Kirk Pops the Question"
1984	Legmen	Leo Gibson	Episode: "I Shall Be Re-Released"
1984	The Duck Factory	Mel Kemper	Episode: "The Annies"
1984	No Man's Land	Deputy Thad Prouty	Television film
1984	Simon & Simon	Brad Daniels	Episode: "Deep Cover"
1985	Matt Houston	Fred	Episode: "Death Watch"
1985	Gimme a Break!	Warren	Episode: "Police Mamas"
1985	George Burns Comedy Week	Stu	Episode: "Home for Dinner"
1985	Scarecrow and Mrs. King	Henry 'Buck' McConnell	2 episodes
1985	Crazy Like a Fox	Chick	Episode: "Requiem for a Fox"
1985-1986	Night Court	Howie / Preston Cowdrey	2 episodes
1986	The Longshot	Realtor	Feature film
1986	Punky Brewster	Cheapo Chester	Episode: "Cherie Lifesaver"
1986	Blacke's Magic	Hal Renquist	Episode: "Death Goes to the Movies"
1986	Murder, She Wrote	Earl Fargo	Episode: "Murder in the Electric Cathedral"
1986	Sidekicks	Detective R.T. Mooney	Recurring role, 5 episodes
1986	Night Court	Preston Cowdrey	Episode: "Prince of a Guy"
1988	You Can't Hurry Love	Chuck Hayes	Feature film
1988–1990	Just the Ten of Us	Father Robert Hargis	Main role, 22 episodes
1991	Going Under	Soviet General	Feature film
1991–1993	The New WKRP in Cincinnati	Herb Tarlek	Main role, 45 episodes
1993	Evening Shade	Walt Thompson	Episode: "She What?!"
1994–1997	Saved by the Bell: The New Class	Mr. Harrington	Recurring role, 5 episodes
1995	The Mommies	Director	Episode: "Selling Out"
1995	The Colony	Frank Williamson	Television film
1997	USA High	Mr. Giggles (Dentist)	Episode: "The Odd Couple"
1998	Motel	Gressil	Feature film
2000	City Guys	Jake	Episode: "Meet Mr. History"
2003	A Light in the Forest	Kimmel	Feature film
2004	Shut Up and Kiss Me	Harvey Ballister	Feature film
2004	A Norwegian Lunch	Teacher	Short film
2008	Remembering Phil	Motel Clerk	Feature film
2014	Under the Hollywood Sign	Larry	Feature film

=== As director ===
Year	Title	Notes
1980–1982	WKRP in Cincinnati	6 episodes
1982	Family Ties	Episode: "No Nukes Is Good Nukes"
1986–1990	Head of the Class	2 episodes
1988	Frank's Place	Episode: "The Bum Out Front"
1988	The Van Dyke Show	Episode: "Fatal Condo"
1988–1990	Just the Ten of Us	8 episodes
1989	Who's the Boss?	Episode: "Working Girls"
1989–1990	The Famous Teddy Z	2 episodes
1990	Evening Shade	Episode: "Fast Women"
1990	You Take the Kids	Episode: "Merry Christmas to All and a Pointy Hat to You"
1991–1993	Harry and the Hendersons	11 episodes
1991–1993	The New WKRP in Cincinnati	7 episodes
1995	Fudge	Episode: "Bad Housekeeping"
1995	The Mommies	4 episodes
1996	Campus Cops	Episode: "Sister, Sister"
1997	Saved by the Bell: The New Class	4 episodes
1997–1998	USA High	6 episodes
1997–2001	City Guys	105 episodes
2003	Living Straight	TV film
2010	Desire and Deceit	Unknown episode
