= Gary Sandy =

American actor (b. 1945)

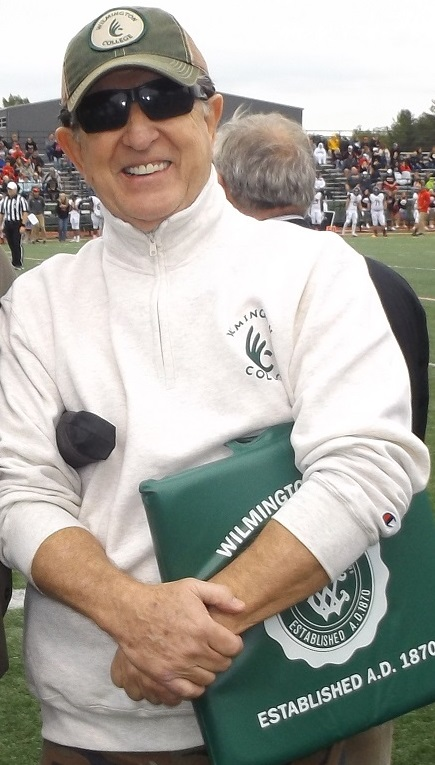
- Gary Sandy at Wilmington College, Ohio, September 2018
- Born: Gary Lee Sandy; December 25, 1945 (age 80); Dayton, Ohio, U.S.
- Education: Wilmington College; American Academy of Dramatic Arts
- Occupation: Actor
- Years active: 1969–present
- Known for: Andy Travis role in WKRP in Cincinnati
- Website: garysandy.com

Gary Lee Sandy (born December 25, 1945) is an American actor. He is best known for playing program director Andy Travis on the television sitcom WKRP in Cincinnati (1978–1982).

== Early life and education ==
Sandy was born in Dayton, Ohio, the son of Austin and Dolores Sandy. He attended Fairmont High School in Kettering, Ohio, and lived in Moraine, Ohio. He later attended Wilmington College in Wilmington, Ohio, and the American Academy of Dramatic Arts in New York City.

== Television ==
Sandy's early TV career included appearances on several soap operas in the late 1960s and early 1970s. He made his professional acting debut in Another World in 1969. He also appeared in The Secret Storm, As The World Turns, and Somerset.

Sandy made number of appearances as a guest on primetime shows, including Medical Center, Barnaby Jones, CHiPs, and Starsky & Hutch, as well as in a number of television movies.

Sandy's most notable role was as Andy Travis, the new program director at a struggling radio station on the CBS sitcom WKRP in Cincinnati. The idea for the show was based on the real experiences of several people, including creator Hugh Wilson, who had worked in the industry.

Sandy lamented the impact of WKRP on his career and felt that the show had typecast him and limited his opportunities. He had ambitions of a movie career, which he had wanted mainly to have greater control over the scripts offered to him, that never materialized. He does not have any qualms about the role itself; he felt it was well-written, and it had allowed him to break out of his previous typecasting as a soap opera villain. He also stated that he was proud of the fact that the role had inspired people to enter the profession of radio broadcasting in real life.

After WKRP ended in 1982, Sandy declined several other permanent roles, feeling they were shallow and inferior characters. He continued to make guest appearances on The Young and The Restless, L.A. Law, Murder, She Wrote, Sabrina the Teenage Witch, Martial Law, and the 2004 Hallmark Channel television movie A Place Called Home, among others.

In 2024, Sandy appeared in A Very Carillon Christmas, a 35-minute local television special set in Dayton, Ohio's Carillon Historical Park. The show won an Ohio Valley Regional Emmy Award.

== Film ==
Sandy has had roles in Some of My Best Friends Are... (1971), Hail to the Chief (1972), The Last of the Cowboys (1977), Troll (1986), and The Insider (1999).

== Theater ==
Sandy has appeared in more than 100 theatrical productions. His Broadway debut was in 1974 in Saturday Sunday Monday, directed by Franco Zeffirelli.

In 1982, he replaced Kevin Kline as the Pirate King on Broadway in The Pirates of Penzance. In 1986, he replaced Tony Roberts as Mortimer Brewster in the 50th-anniversary production of Arsenic and Old Lace opposite Jean Stapleton, Marion Ross, Larry Storch, and Jonathan Frid, and continued the role in the North American tour. In 1992, he played Billy Flynn in the Los Angeles production of Chicago alongside Juliet Prowse and Bebe Neuwirth. Beginning in 2001, he starred opposite Ann-Margret in a stage production of The Best Little Whorehouse in Texas, which toured for two years.

He has also appeared off Broadway in Pequod (1969), The Children's Mass (1973), and Lone Star Love (2004).

Sandy continued to perform in regional theater, playing such roles as Elliot Garfield in The Goodbye Girl and Harold Hill in seven different productions of The Music Man.

In the 2010s and 2020s, Sandy played Mike Hammer in Encore for Murder, a stage play performed in the style of a golden age radio drama. He has also appeared in similar on-stage radio drama re-enacentments of Agatha Christie radio mysteries.
