= Les Nessman =

Character on the television situation comedy WKRP in Cincinnati

- WKRP in Cincinnati character
- Richard Sanders as Les Nessman
- Portrayed by: Richard Sanders

In-universe information
- Gender: Male
- Occupation: radio news anchor/reporter
- Family: Harvey Moorhouse (father); Lester Nessman Sr. (adoptive father)
- Spouse: Demi (divorced)
- Relatives: Eureka Nessman (adoptive great-aunt)
- Nationality: American

Lester "Les" Nessman Jr. is a fictional character on the television situation comedy WKRP in Cincinnati (1978–82) played by Richard Sanders. He reprised his role in the sequel series, The New WKRP in Cincinnati.

== Background and appearance ==
Les was raised in Dayton by his mother and stepfather (who he thought was his biological father). He has been employed by WKRP since 1954, beginning as an office boy and cub reporter. In the episode "Secrets of Dayton Heights", he fails a security check for a press conference because his biological father had belonged to the Communist party. He is shocked, inasmuch as he himself is virulently anti-Communist, an attitude instilled in him by his embittered mother (also played by Sanders). He goes to visit Harvey Moorehouse, his biological father, working as a barber, and finds that he isn't such a bad guy, and that Moorehouse likely gave up his son to spare him the shame of his alleged Communist activities. Les decides to continue to go to Moorehouse's barber shop in an effort to get to know his father, but chooses not to reveal his identity to Moorehouse.

The slight, balding, bespectacled man always wears a bow tie (though he wore a standard necktie in the pilot episode) and always has a bandage somewhere on his person, a running gag that began with the actor's first appearance (when he actually needed a bandage due to a backstage injury). Lines explaining the injury were written and then cut, and thereafter Les simply appeared each week with a new bandage and new unexplained injury. The producers explained that the gag was overlooked by audience members, who didn't remember that Les has a large dog named Phil at his home, and Les often lives in fear of being attacked or bitten, thus the need for the bandages.

== Les at WKRP ==
Les is the ludicrously incompetent news director of WKRP and has been with the station since 1954. Of the station's numerous cast members, Nessman's constant bungling, baseless pride and insistence on keeping his full-service trappings on the rock-oriented station generally poses the biggest obstacle to the station's success outside of ownership. Knowing very little about sports (or, for that matter, news in general), he makes several glaring errors, for example mispronouncing golfer Chi Chi Rodriguez' name as "Chy Chy Rod-ri-gweeze", referring to chihuahuas as "chee-hooah-hooahs", and calling a women's swimming event "breast stroking." He consistently refuses to acknowledge or correct any errors, even when another staff member (usually Johnny) tries to correct him. Program director Andy Travis complains that Nessman completely missed one of the most important stories of 1979, the Iranian Revolution, because he focused on a human interest story about a pig that could do addition and subtraction. In at least one episode the viewer can hear the WKRP motto do a play on words about Les's incompetence: "more music and Les Nessman". Les's best friend at the station is sales manager Herb Tarlek; Herb collectively refers to himself and Les as "the suits" due to their more bureaucratic roles versus the DJs, and the pair see themselves as possessing more prestige and power at the station than they really wield.

Les's area of greatest expertise is agriculture; he is a five-time winner of the fictitious Ohio radio news trophy, the "Buckeye Newshawk Award" (given to the best news story specifically about, or related to, tap root vegetable production in "the tri-state area"), and has won the award an additional three times by the time of The New WKRP in Cincinnati. He has also won the coveted "Silver Sow Award" (for excellence in farm news, particularly hog reports), and the "Copper Cob Award" (also for farm broadcasting). Sanders explained that the Silver Sow award was invented as a plot device to give Les a reason to ask Jennifer on a date. The award subsequently "tickled the fancy of hog producers across the country." He also has an unusual amount of psychological expertise, correctly diagnosing Johnny Fever with a "schizoid disorder" when he begins treating his television alter-ego Rip Tide as a separate individual he feels is subsuming his own personality (Les recognized the symptoms from the movies The Three Faces of Eve and Sybil). Several episodes of the series also imply that Les was formerly promiscuous in his youth and unexpectedly accomplished in seducing women, with Les sincerely telling his coworkers that he "got tired" of one-night-stands. The episode "Les' Groupie" explores the consequences of one such encounter evolving into a one-sided relationship, with Les expertly role-playing a faux lovers' spat with Jennifer. In "Daydreams", Jennifer is shown to have a sexual fantasy featuring Les.

Les is one of the station's oldest employees and frequently used to lampoon or draw attention to outdated stereotypes and prejudices, often acting as a minor antagonist to the other characters (albeit one who frequently sees the error of his ways). He insistently refers to black DJ Venus Flytrap as "a negro" and expresses surprise and confusion when he fails to embody the stereotypes with which Les was raised. Les also initially attempts to sabotage junior reporter Bailey Quarters' career due to his belief that only men should work in the field; although he eventually becomes supportive of Bailey becoming a fully-fledged member of WKRP's news team, he still occasionally bristles at her higher level of competence, and on one occasion plagiarizes a story she had been working on. Les also maintains a 50s-era McCarthyist worldview in which Communists have infiltrated all walks of American life and are a persistent threat to the nation; several of his news broadcasts devolve into rants advocating America to bomb its enemies "off the map."

The episode "Les on a Ledge" features a distraught Les standing outside one of the station's windows in an apparent suicide attempt after he is accused of being homosexual and therefore banned from the Riverfront Stadium locker room (the episode does not specify whether it was from the Reds or Bengals). The rest of the characters try to figure the situation out and talk him off the ledge, with Bruce, the player who made the original comment, eventually calling Les to apologize.

Les is prominently featured in WKRP's most famous episode, "Turkeys Away" (season 1, episode 7), in which he reports on what turns into a disastrous station promotion, evoking Herbert Morrison's emotional description of the 1937 Hindenburg disaster. This scene is widely acknowledged to be one of the funniest moments in television history. In an apparent in-joke reference to Alfred Hitchcock's movie The Birds in which a near victim is trapped by birds in a phone booth, Nessman saves himself from being ganged up on by the turkeys by taking refuge in a phone booth. A running gag is that Nessman's reporting ends in disaster: in "The Airplane Show" episode, Nessman is taken "hostage" by a crazy veteran pilot who wants to draw attention to peoples' indifference to Veterans Day.

Les longs to "move up" to a higher-paying job as a TV newsman, and in one episode he shows a video tape to his station friends of himself reporting the news; unfortunately for Les, the tape is so cheaply and badly made, that Nessman runs out quite embarrassed. In another episode, Les shows Venus Flytrap how he has been dyeing his skin black — a parody of John Howard Griffin's Black Like Me. When Bailey Quarters is promoted to on-air news reporter, Les is jealous enough to attempt to upstage her by plagiarizing an initial draft of one of her news stories, unaware that it is partially fictional and thus puts the station's broadcast license in jeopardy.

Les works in the WKRP bullpen, a big room with desks for several of the employees. Les believes that as the news director, he should have his own private office, so he puts masking tape on the floor around his desk indicating where his office walls would be. He insists that anyone who approaches his desk must knock at an imaginary door and wait for permission to come in. He mimes opening and closing a door whenever he sits down at or leaves his desk; once he even took out a set of keys to lock the nonexistent door. All of his colleagues respect his insistence on maintaining his own private space, and play along with his "walls" charade. Mr. Carlson 'knocks' on Les' door by clicking his heels together, and even leans in on an imaginary door jamb, but Jennifer is permitted to ignore the imaginary walls.

== Cultural references ==
Les' initial chauvinistic resistance to Bailey working in the "man's world" of journalism, and his eventual acceptance of her as an equal was an important story arc that has been repeatedly noted as a significant reflection of changing gender roles during this time.

Les Nessman has made numerous "real life" appearances around the country. During WKRP's run, these included appearances at many pork producer association events — Nessman having become the darling of the industry, where he received real-life versions of the fictional "Silver Sow Award" — and singing rock and roll music at nightclubs. In 1985, Sanders guest-hosted the morning drive slot on Anchorage, Alaska, radio station KENI in character as Les Nessman, the first "real-life" appearance of Les since cancellation of WKRP. While Sanders simply flew into Anchorage to make the appearance, Les took the wrong bus, wound up in Texas, hitchhiked from there to North Dakota and then to Great Slave Lake, rode with a bush pilot to Whitehorse, bought a motorscooter, was sighted near Tok, was arrested for a minor traffic infraction, and then was bailed out of jail by the station. Subsequent appearances by Sanders as Les included the 1997 Lexington, Kentucky, Christmas parade, during which he simulated a re-enactment of the famous "Turkeys Away" episode.

Eminem references Les Nessman in the song "As the World Turns".

Another rap-reference nod to Les Nessman is by the rap group Atmosphere from Minnesota on the song "Millennium Dodo".

In an episode of The CW series Reaper he was a fictitious employee the character 'Sock' made up in order to double his wages and receive other benefits, although WKRP in Cincinnati itself was unmentioned in the episode.
