= Liz & Dick =

2012 biographical film

- DVD cover
- Genre: Biographical drama
- Written by: Christopher Monger
- Directed by: Lloyd Kramer
- Starring: Lindsay Lohan; Grant Bowler
- Music by: Lee Holdridge
- Country of origin: United States
- Original language: English

Production
- Executive producer: Larry A. Thompson
- Producers: Kyle Clark; Lina Wong; Robert G. Endara II
- Cinematography: Paula Huidobro
- Editor: Scott Chestnut
- Running time: 88 minutes
- Production company: Larry A. Thompson Productions

Original release
- Network: Lifetime
- Release: November 25, 2012

Liz & Dick is a 2012 American biographical drama television film chronicling the relationship of Elizabeth Taylor and Richard Burton. It was directed by Lloyd Kramer, written by Christopher Monger, and produced by Larry A. Thompson. The film stars Lindsay Lohan as Taylor and Grant Bowler as Burton. It premiered on Lifetime on November 25, 2012.

== Plot ==
Throughout the film, Elizabeth and Richard appear in a dark room and reminisce about their life together. On August 5, 1984 in Celigny, Switzerland, an elderly Richard is writing what would be his last letter to Elizabeth and recalls the first time he saw her at a Hollywood party. He then finishes the letter and goes to rest.

In July 1961, Richard flies to Rome, Italy to begin filming as Mark Antony in Cleopatra, which stars Elizabeth. He tries to compliment her but it comes off as rude. Later he goes to a restaurant where Elizabeth is dining and attempts to make her like him; again he comes off as rude and she leaves abruptly. His wife Sybil is suspicious of his intentions. Later, during filming of Cleopatra, Elizabeth has a change of heart and invites Richard into her trailer for a drink. However, she accuses him of trying to seduce her.

Eventually they succumb to their attractions and begin an on-set affair that soon makes national news. Later, during a private gathering, Richard publicly asks Elizabeth whether she loves him or her husband, Eddie Fisher. She confesses that she loves him more and splits from Eddie. Richard showers Elizabeth with expensive jewels in Rome, but returns to Sybil after she attempts suicide; Richard and Elizabeth part ways after Sybil refuses to divorce him. Elizabeth is briefly hospitalized for overdosing on pills and Cleopatra's filming ends bitterly.

Three months later, Elizabeth is relaxing in Gstaad, Switzerland with her family, but feels bored. She meets up with Richard and they resume their affair. When she learns that Richard will be filming The V.I.P.s (1963) with Sophia Loren, she convinces the film's director Anthony Asquith to fire Loren and hire her, which he eventually does. The relationship is derailed again when Sybil and Eddie refuse to divorce them; then Sybil gives Richard a divorce. They are heavily criticized by the media; their union is labeled "erotic vagrancy" by The Vatican. Eddie divorces Elizabeth, who marries Richard in March 1964.

The couple sign on to film Who's Afraid of Virginia Woolf?, in which their characters have long arguments, as they do. Richard is saddened after missing out on an Academy Award for the film The Spy Who Came in from the Cold (1965). Elizabeth begins gaining weight and becomes insecure. They are both Academy Award-nominated for their roles in Who's Afraid of Virginia Woolf?, but only Elizabeth wins, causing Richard to become hostile again.

To escape the media, the couple travel to Portofino and buy a yacht, where they reside—and constantly fight. He makes a remark about her "pudgy fingers" and promptly apologizes. She asks him to buy her a ring and he purchases a 69-carat diamond which becomes known as The Taylor-Burton Diamond. Richard's brother Ifor Jenkins becomes crippled by an accident Richard blames himself for; after Richard and Elizabeth have returned home, Ifor dies. Richard becomes depressed and starts cheating on Elizabeth and drinking. They decide to divorce.

Months later, Elizabeth experiences a colon cancer health scare and asks to see Richard. She turns out to be fine, Richard realizes he needs her in his life, and they remarry in Africa; unfortunately, they re-divorce again mere months later.

Richard dies in his sleep in Celigny. Elizabeth's mother Sara informs her of his death, and she faints. His wife bans her from attending his funeral; the next week she visits his grave in Celigny — yet another moment with him that is intruded on by the paparazzi.

== Cast ==
- Lindsay Lohan as Elizabeth Taylor
- Grant Bowler as Richard Burton
- Theresa Russell as Sara Taylor
- David Hunt as Ifor Jenkins
- Bruce Nozick as Bernard
- Tanya Franks as Sybil Burton
- Charles Shaughnessy as Anthony Asquith
- David Eigenberg as Ernest Lehman
- Creed Bratton as Darryl Zanuck
- Andy Hirsch as Eddie Fisher
- Adam J. Yeend as The V.I.P.s' 1st AD
- Taylor Ann Thompson as Kate Burton, age 10
- Trevor Thompson as Christopher Wilding, age 7
- Brian Howe as Joseph Mankiewicz
- Henry Hereford as London Hotel Manager
- Michael Matucci as Gianni Bulgari

== Production ==
=== Conception ===
Hollywood actress Elizabeth Taylor and Welsh actor Richard Burton first met on the set of their 1963 film Cleopatra, in which they played Antony and Cleopatra, two of the most "famous lovers in history", while married to others. Their affair became one of the most widespread scandals at the time. Michael Thornton of The Daily Telegraph described the relationship, that saw the couple marry and divorce twice, as the "tempestuous saga of Liz and Dick". Their love was described as an addiction; shortly prior to her death, Taylor stated: "The truth is I now don't give a damn about most of those men. Richard is the only one I truly loved and still care about. I shall miss him until the day I die", referring to her various marriages.

Taylor and Burton have been referred to as "the most turbulent love story ever told", with Marie Claire opining: "their union was probably the most notorious and dramatic of the 20th century". Despite the end of their tumultuous relationship, Burton remained in love with Taylor, writing thousands of notes about his love for her in a secret diary until his death in August 1984.

Following Taylor's death in March 2011, speculation arose about a film based on her life. In May, during their upfront presentation to advertisers, Lifetime announced that they would develop a biopic chronicling the relationship of Taylor and Burton, entitled Elizabeth & Richard: A Love Story.

=== Pre-production ===
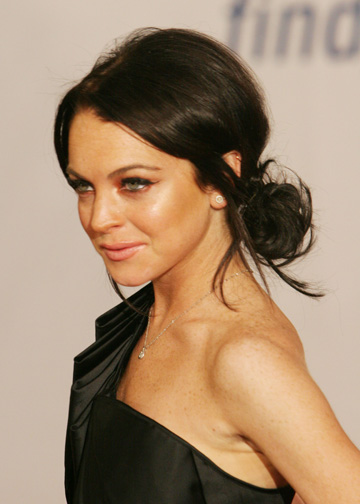
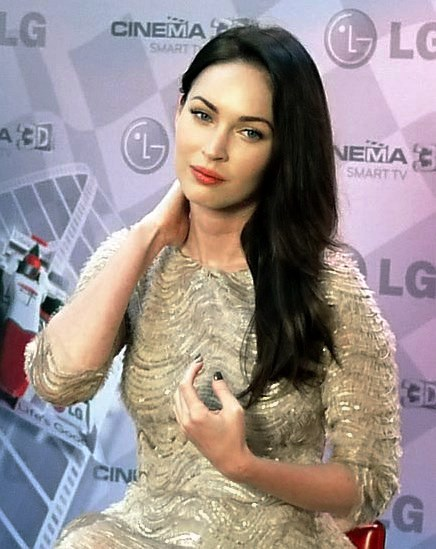
Lohan (left) and Fox (right) were considered the two strongest contenders for the role of Taylor.

For the role of Taylor, producer Larry Thompson created a short list of actresses to play the part, including Megan Fox, Lindsay Lohan, Olivia Wilde, and Kate Beckinsale. Lohan and Fox, who worked together on 2004's Confessions of a Teenage Drama Queen, were considered the two strongest contenders for the role.

Lohan's casting as Taylor was confirmed on April 23, 2012, with Rob Sharenow, Lifetime's Executive Vice-President of Programming, stating: "We are thrilled Lindsay will portray beloved Hollywood legend Elizabeth Taylor. She is one of the rare actresses who possesses the talent, beauty and intrigue to capture the spirit of such a provocative icon". Lohan, who has "always admired and had enormous respect for Elizabeth Taylor", stated that she was "very honored" to have been chosen to play the role. Lohan had previously posed as Taylor on the June 2006 cover of Interview magazine. To prepare for the role, Lohan hired a voice coach and dyed her auburn hair a deep brunette to "better match Taylor's dark tresses".

In an interview with The Hollywood Reporter Thompson stated that the biggest challenge for the film was the decision to cast Lohan. He stated that he was keen of her playing the role of Taylor, but was not "sure of her level of commitment". Thompson also revealed that the producers faced issues with insuring Lohan, stemming from her various legal and medical issues. He stated that: "Lindsay Lohan may be the most insured actress that ever walked on a soundstage." According to Thompson, "a lot of people" were shocked by the casting of Lohan.

For the role of Burton, the producers wanted to cast someone who was Welsh or at least British. On May 24, 2012, two weeks before filming was set to begin, Grant Bowler was confirmed to have been cast as Burton. Bowler, who is from New Zealand, was cast after a reading with Lohan, having had the most impressive audition tape, according to Thompson. He stated that Bowler has the "testosterone, looks, intelligence and the voice we needed for Burton". Thompson remarked that: "Grant will add gravitas to our couple and bring to life one of the greatest actors who has ever lived."

=== Filming ===
On June 8, while on her way to the film's set, Lohan's rented Porsche collided into the back of an 18-wheeler on the Pacific Coast Highway. Lohan and her assistant were taken to UCLA Medical Center, with Lohan being released within 2 hours. As the film's producers had hired a car to transport Lohan to and from the set, Thompson expressed frustration and confusion over why she had taken her own vehicle. Lohan refused to postpone filming for the day and instead covered up her "bumps and bruises with make-up".

On June 15, the fire department paramedics were called to Lohan's penthouse at the Ritz-Carlton Hotel. Lohan, who had been working a "grueling schedule" over a period of a few days, working through the night into the early morning, took a nap before shooting her final scene of the day. Steve Honig, Lohan's rep, told Entertainment Weekly that the producers were "concerned when she did not come out of her room and called paramedics as a precaution. Lindsay was examined and is fine, but did suffer some exhaustion and dehydration." She continued to film her scenes for the film that afternoon.

On June 20, it was revealed that production on Liz & Dick was under investigation by the SAG-AFTRA and IATSE labor unions for overworking its actors and members of its film crew after Lohan and two crew members received medical treatment for exhaustion and dehydration. A representative for SAG-AFTRA issued a statement stating: "We're looking into this matter, but can't yet provide any verified information". Thompson denied the allegations, stating that: "We have not been contacted by anyone at SAG-AFTRA about any complaint ... [nor] by anyone at IATSE about any investigation ... We are in total compliance with all Guild regulations on Liz & Dick." Filming for Liz & Dick wrapped on July 3.

=== Styling ===
According to Thompson, wardrobe is a "part of the magic" in a film. The film contains 117 costume changes between Lohan and Bowler, with Lohan having 66 different costumes. Thompson had some of Taylor's most famous jewelry recreated for the film, including the 33-carat Krupp Diamond. Lohan also wore several of Taylor's vintage dresses for the film. Lohan's hair and makeup spans all of Taylor's looks, "from the long lashes and red lips of the 1950s and the Cleopatra-inspired eyeliner and nude mouth of the '60s to her teased '80s bouffant, always with her trademark eyeliner to accentuate her famous violet eyes." Lohan also wore opalescent lavender contact lenses for the role.

Academy Award-winning hair and make-up artist Beatrice De Alba was hired as head of the film's hair department, helping to craft the many wigs used in the film. Lohan brought in her own makeup to be used, consisting of Chanel, Dior and M.A.C products. Alba stated that: "She [Lohan] looks so much like her. There was a moment when she saw her picture on the monitor and said 'I'm her.' It was thrilling."

== Release ==
=== Marketing ===
On June 5, the first official photo was released of Lohan and Bowler in their roles of Taylor and Burton. Lohan has a black bob, smoky eye makeup, and lipstick, with Bowler kissing her neck. The photo was released in black and white to give it a "classic" look. Two additional promotional images were released the next day, one of Lohan and one of Bowler. On July 20, a 15-second promo spot for Liz & Dick aired during Lifetime's Project Runway season 10 premiere. The promo features an image of Lohan as Taylor, and the words: "Lindsay Lohan is Elizabeth Taylor". Three stills of Lohan taken from the film were released on August 30. The first promotional poster for Liz & Dick was revealed on September 19, 2012. Lohan is seen wearing dark red lipstick and draped in diamonds. Alongside Lohan are the words that describe Taylor's story: "controversial love affairs", "diamonds", "provocative", "scandal", "tabloid front page", "child star", "leading lady", and "paparazzi". On September 28, a behind-the-scenes featurette was released. During the film's premiere, Lifetime promoted a live discussion with the hashtag trend "Liz and Dick" on social networking website Twitter, which quickly became popular and was used by various celebrities.

=== Ratings ===
The film premiered on Lifetime on November 25, 2012. Bringing in 3.5 million viewers, Liz & Dick became the fourth most-watched movie that aired on the channel in 2012, behind Steel Magnolias (6.5 million), Drew Peterson: Untouchable (5.8 million) and Abducted: The Carlina White Story (3.5 million). The film drew 1.3 million adults 25–54 and 1.3 million adults 18–49, "with women making up the great majority of viewers in both demos". Ratings were lower than expected given the amount of press coverage the film received. Variety described the ratings as "a disappointment with all the pre-debut buzz the project was getting in social media outlets", as well as the publicity that came from Lohan portraying Taylor.

=== Home video ===
Liz & Dick was released on DVD in the United States on May 14, 2013.

== Reception ==
=== Critical response ===
Liz & Dick received generally negative reviews from contemporary film critics. On Metacritic, the film has a weighted average score of 26 out of 100, based on 27 reviews, indicating "generally unfavorable" reviews.

Joanne Ostrow of The Denver Post stated that "no matter what you think of the actors, the great period stylings, not to mention Cleopatra-period costumes, make this jewel-encrusted, cocktail-soaked, often tragic saga a rip-roaring good time". Matt Roush of TV Guide panned the film, calling it "an epic of pathetic miscasting" and "laughably inept". David Wiegand of the San Francisco Chronicle stated that the film is "so terrible, you'll need to ice your face when it's over to ease the pain of wincing for two hours" and "the performances range from barely adequate to terrible. That would be Bowler in the "barely adequate" slot and Lohan, well, in the other one." Jeff Simon of The Buffalo News noted, based on a consensus of other reviews, that "it's the howler everyone expected" and openly mused that the film could end Lohan's acting career. The Hollywood Reporter called Lohan's performance in Liz & Dick "spectacularly bad", likening her take on Elizabeth Taylor as "half train wreck, half SNL skit". Ken Tucker of Entertainment Weekly mocked the actress's "frozen face" and "blank stare" and called the film a "dinky, tin-eared production". Rob Salem of the Toronto Star criticized the film's script written by Christopher Monger as being "written in crayon".

Not all reviews were totally negative. Joyce Slaton of Common Sense Media thought the film to be "campy and overwrought", but "great fun". Bill Harris of QMI Agency chastised his fellow critics when he reviewed the film for the Toronto Sun, writing:

Some of my fellow critics have been venomous in their reviews of Lindsay Lohan's performance in the made-for-TV movie Liz & Dick". "Newsflash: Lindsay Lohan never has been Meryl Streep. Lohan's performance as Elizabeth Taylor in Liz & Dick isn't going to win awards, but it's not the worst thing ever. So back off a bit, folks. If it weren't Lindsay Lohan, critics merely would be shrugging and moving on, rather than dipping their pens in poison. By the way, do you know who also wasn't Meryl Streep? Elizabeth Taylor. Liz & Dick shines a light on two famous people who brought out both the best and the worst of each other. Whenever Richard Burton and Elizabeth Taylor were together, either on screen or off, every single person in their vicinity was watching them at all times. That claustrophobic atmosphere is recreated in Liz & Dick by way of Lohan and Bowler being in practically every scene. ... Whether Liz & Dick works for you remains to be seen.

He concluded by saying that he thinks Bowler did a terrific job, "And Lindsay Lohan? Well, at least keep your expectations realistic, okay?" Richard Brody of The New Yorker compared Lohan to Taylor: "one of the most impulsively, spontaneously emotional actresses of our time portrays a similar performer," stating that, "For all the differences in their circumstances, accomplishments, and worlds—Lohan's performance (not her impersonation) is thrillingly immediate, not a composition of interpretive pieces but an incontrovertible, full-spectrum presence, even if the mirror itself is broken and some shards of character are still missing from view." In another analysis of the film's critical reception, Brody wrote: "Lindsay Lohan's performance in the rather mediocre TV film Liz & Dick (which, however—I should have mentioned—features the admirable script conceit of a virtual posthumous interview with the protagonists) received unfortunately (and unwarrantedly nasty) negative reviews," continuing, "Despite the gaps that Lohan's travails have torn in her career and the holes they have likely torn in her psyche, her very presence, in a movie such as Liz & Dick, comes packed with an intensity and an anguish that perhaps no other actor of her generation can offer, regardless of technical skill."

=== Accolades ===
Award	Year	Category	Nominee(s)	Result	Ref.
Dorian Awards	2012	Campy TV Show of the Year	Liz & Dick	Won	
Guild of Music Supervisors Awards	2013	Best Music Supervision for Television Long Form	Frankie Pine	Nominated	
Primetime Creative Arts Emmy Awards	2013	Outstanding Hairstyling for a Limited Series or Movie	Beatrice Marie De Alba, LeeAnn Brittenham, Richard De Alba	Nominated	
Primetime Creative Arts Emmy Awards	2013	Outstanding Makeup for a Limited Series or Movie (Non-Prosthetic)	Eryn Krueger Mekash, Kim Ayers, Myriam Arougheti	Nominated	

== See also ==
- List of television shows notable for negative reception
