= Larry A. Thompson =

American film producer

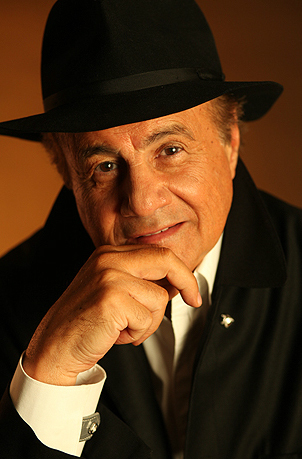
- Thompson in 2012
- Born: August 1, 1944 (age 82); Clarksdale, Mississippi, U.S.
- Education: University of Mississippi (JD)
- Occupations: Film producer, talent manager
- Years active: 1970–present
- Political party: Republican
- Spouses: Pamela Ann Edwards (m. 1976; div. 1985); Kelly Ann Leblanc (m. 1999; div. 2025)
- Website: http://www.larrythompsonorg.com, http://www.larrythompsonforcongress.com

Larry A. Thompson (born August 1, 1944) is an American film producer, manager, lawyer, author, and motivational speaker. Long known for his work in Hollywood, he has twice been a Republican candidate for the United States House of Representatives.

== Early life and education ==
Thompson was born in Clarksdale, Mississippi, to Angelo and Anne (maiden name, Tuminello) Thompson. He graduated from the University of Mississippi with a Juris Doctor (J.D.) in 1968.

== Career ==
Thompson started his entertainment-industry career as in-house counsel for Capitol Records. He was the youngest lawyer working for the label and negotiated separate contracts for each of the Beatles when the group broke up. By the 1970s, he was a founding partner in the entertainment law firm of Thompson, Shankman, Bond and Moss. For five years, he packaged movie and television projects and represented the careers of many prominent actors and performers. He also orchestrated the $300-million-dollar merger of Harrah's and Holiday Inn.

When the law partnership was dissolved, Thompson created the Larry A. Thompson Organization, a company devoted to film production and the personal management of talent.

Thompson and fellow lawyers Harry E. Sloan and Larry Kuppin subsequently purchased New World Pictures from Roger Corman for $16.5 million and immediately took the company public. He sold his New World equity position in 1983 and refocused his attention to independent film production and talent management. He received the Vision Award in 1993.

=== Talent management ===
Thompson and his company have managed over 200 artists including Charlene Tilton, Drew Barrymore, Jason Bateman, Justine Bateman, Linda Blair, Robert Blake, Bruce Boxleitner, Delta Burke, Cindy Crawford, William Devane, Donna Dixon, Shannen Doherty, Linda Evans, Steve Guttenberg, Merle Haggard, Scott Hamilton, Mariska Hargitay, David Hasselhoff, Iman, Sally Kellerman, Donna Mills, Tatum O'Neal, Richard Pryor, Joan Rivers, Melissa Rivers, William Shatner, Sonny & Cher, Tori Spelling, Alan Thicke, Cicely Tyson, and Barry White.

=== Productions ===
Thompson's productions include:

- Little Girl Lost: The Delimar Vera Story (air date August 17, 2008) on Lifetime Movie Network, was the highest-rated two-hour movie in that network's 10-year history. In 2009, the movie garnered six Imagen Awards nominations, of which it won two: one for Best Primetime Television Program and the other for Best Actor/Television – Hector Bustamante.
- Amish Grace (air date March 28, 2010), based on the true story of the 2006 Nickel Mines, Pennsylvania, schoolhouse shooting, premiered on Lifetime Movie Network and became the highest-rated original movie on that network.
- Liz & Dick (air date November 28, 2012) is a Lifetime Television movie starring Lindsay Lohan and Grant Bowler, directed by Lloyd Kramer, and written by Christopher Monger, which chronicles the love story of Elizabeth Taylor and Richard Burton. It drew an audience of 3.5 million people and has been nominated for two Emmys, one each for hairstyling and makeup.
- Thompson produced William Shatner's one-man show on Broadway, entitled Shatner's World: We Just Live in It..., which ran at The Music Box in New York from February 16 – March 4, 2012 and toured North America. The December 8, 2012 performance was filmed for a broadcast release.
- In 2013, Thompson began developing a project about the life of Oprah Winfrey, based on Kitty Kelley's Oprah: A Biography.
- In April 2013, Thompson optioned the screenplay Missing Mona Lisa, written by Mark Hudelson, "a slightly romanticized telling of the fact-based story" of how Vincenzo Peruggia stole Leonardo da Vinci's masterpiece, Mona Lisa, from the Louvre in 1913.
- Ladies of the '80s: A Divas Christmas stars Loni Anderson, Morgan Fairchild, Linda Gray, Donna Mills, Nicollette Sheridan, Travis Burns, and Taylor Ann Thompson. (Air date December 2, 2023) on Lifetime (TV network).

=== Book packager ===
Thompson is also a book packager. He has developed books with Joan Rivers, including a series of murder mystery novels titled The Red Carpet Murder Mysteries,

== U.S. congressional candidate ==
Thompson is running for United States Congress in California's 32nd congressional district in the 2026 general election on November 3 against Democrat Brad Sherman. In 2024, Thompson ran for the United States Congress in California's 32nd congressional district as a Republican. He was unanimously endorsed by the California Republican Party and the Los Angeles County Republican Party. Thompson had also been endorsed by: the Ventura County Republican Party, the American Independent Party, California College Republicans, Los Angeles County Young Republicans, and California Young Republicans, as well as by Brock Pierce (chairman of the Bitcoin Foundation) and Perianne Boring, Founder & CEO of the Chamber of Digital Commerce. The primary election was on March 5, 2024. Thompson advanced to the general election on November 5, 2024; he lost the general election to incumbent Democrat Brad Sherman, who won with 66.2% of the vote. As reported by Ballotpedia.org, Thompson received 108,711 votes in the 2024 General Election in his bid for Congress, which is the most votes ever received by any candidate running against Brad Sherman in his 28 years in office.

Thompson ran for Congress in California's 37th congressional district as an independent in 2020.

== Personal life ==
As of 2013, Thompson lived in Beverly Hills, California with his wife Kelly. They have two children, including Taylor. Thompson and Kelly divorced in 2025.

== Accolades ==
- His productions have received nominations for ten Emmy Awards
- nominations for six Imagen Awards
- nominations for two Prism Awards
- one nomination for the Humanitas Prize
- one nomination for a Golden Globe
- Vision Award, 1993
- Seymour Heller Lifetime Achievement Award
- National Conference of Personal Managers Hall of Fame Inductee
- Thompson was knighted in Rome, Italy on May 20, 2017. Grand Prior, Prince Lorenzo de' Medici, sponsored Thompson, an American of Italian Heritage, into the Ordine di San Martino del Monte delle Beatitudini and presided at the Investiture Mass of Knighthood at the Chiesa di San Silvestro al Quirinale (Church of San Silvestro at Quirinal Hill)
- Albert Nelson Marquis Lifetime Achievement Award by Marquis Who's Who

== Board affiliations ==
As of 2014, Thompson serves on the Advisory Boards of Paulist Productions, The Delta Blues Museum, and Good News Communications.

== Credits ==
=== TV-movies ===
- Mickey Spillane's Margin for Murder (1981)
- Mickey Spillane's Mike Hammer Murder Me, Murder You (1983)
- The Other Lover (1985)
- Convicted (1986)
- Intimate Encounters (1986)
- The Woman He Loved (1988)
- Original Sin (1989)
- Class Cruise (1989)
- Little White Lies (1989)
- Lucy & Desi: Before the Laughter (1991)
- Broken Promises: Taking Emily Back (1993)
- Separated By Murder
- Face of Evil (1996)
- Replacing Dad (1999)
- And The Beat Goes On: The Sonny & Cher Story (1999)
- Murder in the Mirror (2000)
- A Date with Darkness: The Trial and Capture of Andrew Luster (2003)
- Little Girl Lost: The Delimar Vera Story (2008)
- Amish Grace (2010)
- Liz & Dick (2012)
- Ladies of the '80s: A Divas Christmas (2023)

=== Movies ===
- Crimes of Passion (1984)
- Fraternity Vacation (1985)
- Quiet Cool (1986)
- My Demon Lover (1987)
- Breaking the Rules (1992)

=== Television series ===
- The Jim Nabors Show (1978)
- Bring 'Em Back Alive (1982)

=== Television specials and pilots ===
- The Eagle and the Bear (1985)
- Mann in the Middle (1989)
- Tonight at the House of Blues (1998)
- Iron Chef USA: Showdown in Las Vegas (2001)
- Iron Chef USA: Holiday Showdown (2001)
- Comedy Central Roast of Joan Rivers (2009)
- Scott Hamilton: Return to the Ice (2010)
- Joan Rivers: Don't Start With Me (2012)
- Shatner's World...We Just Live In It (2013)
- 22nd Annual Movieguide Faith & Values Awards (producer) Reelz Channel, March 1, 2014.
- 23rd Annual Movieguide Faith & Values Awards (producer) Reelz Channel, February 21, 2015.
- 24th Annual Movieguide Faith & Values Awards (producer) Reelz Channel, February 22, 2016.

=== Books ===
- Thompson, Larry A. (2004). Shine. McGraw-Hill.
- Thompson, Larry A. (2024). Voting In The Age Of Chaos. StarScape Publishing, a division of StarScape Entertainment, Inc.
