= Pauly =

- Also known as: The Pauly Shore Show
- Genre: Sitcom
- Created by: James Berg; Stan Zimmerman
- Directed by: Amanda Bearse; Robert Berlinger; Terri McCoy; Max Tash
- Starring: Pauly Shore; Charlotte Ross; David Dukes; Kevin Weisman; Amy Hill; Theo Greenly
- Composer: Tom Hilbe
- Country of origin: United States
- Original language: English
- No. of seasons: 1
- No. of episodes: 7 (2 unaired)

Production
- Producer: Mitchell Bank
- Running time: 30 minutes
- Production companies: 3 Arts Entertainment; Landing Patch Productions; Zimmerman-Berg; 20th Century Fox Television

Original release
- Network: Fox
- Release: March 3 – April 7, 1997

Pauly, a.k.a. The Pauly Shore Show, is an American sitcom series that aired on Fox from March 3 until April 7, 1997, starring Pauly Shore. It was cancelled after five episodes, leaving two episodes unaired.

== Plot ==
Pauly Sherman is the slacker son of wealthy businessman Edward Sherman. One day, Edward marries Dawn Delaney, a younger woman with her own son. They move in with Pauly, who makes it his mission to ruin their relationship.

== Cast ==
- Pauly Shore as Pauly Sherman
- Charlotte Ross as Dawn Delaney
- David Dukes as Edward Sherman
- Kevin Weisman as Burger
- Amy Hill as Sumi
- Theo Greenly as Zachary Delaney

== Episodes ==
No.	Title	Directed by	Written by	Original release date	Prod. code
1	"Pilot"	Robert Berlinger	James Berg & Stan Zimmerman	March 3, 1997	4P01
When Edward announces his engagement to gold-digging young Dawn, Pauly schemes to break them up.
2	"Spies Like Us"	Amanda Bearse	Story by : Mark Amato; Teleplay by : Dalina Soto-Loesser & Daniel Berendsen & Mark Amato	March 10, 1997	4P05
Pauly and Burger suspect Dawn is sleeping with the new handyman.
3	"Pauly Come Home"	Max Tash	Mark Amato	March 17, 1997	4P02
Feeling ignored by his father, Pauly decides to run away from home.
4	"Foreplay"	Terri McCoy	Dan Berendsen & Dalina Soto-Loesser	March 31, 1997	4P03
Pauly alters his image in an attempt to land a date with a yuppie. Meanwhile, Dawn tries to impress a group of stuffy socialites.
5	"Through the Ringers"	Amanda Bearse	Mark Alton Brown & Dee LaDuke	April 7, 1997	4P06
When Pauly discovers that Dawn once starred in a sleazy flick called Slammer Sluts, he tries to blackmail her by tracking down her costar.
6	"The Babe Magnet"	Matthew Diamond	Bernadette Luckett	Unaired	4P04
Pauly takes a shine to Zach when a flirtatious single mom mistakes Pauly's young step-brother-to-be for his son.
7	"Life's a Drag"	Matthew Diamond	Dana Reston	Unaired	4P07
Pauly jumps at the chance to judge a beauty contest, but he's initially oblivious to the fact that the contestants are drag queens.
