= Taylor Ann Thompson =

American actress (born 2002)

- Born: Los Angeles, California, U.S.
- Occupation: Actress
- Years active: 2007–present

Taylor Ann Thompson is an American actress.

== Early life ==
Thompson was born and raised in Los Angeles, California. Her mother is Boston native and Seaology creator, Kelly Ann Thompson, and her father is film producer and talent manager, Larry A. Thompson.

== Education ==
Thompson graduated with honors from New York University Tisch School of the Arts Drama in 2022.

== Career ==
At the age of 4, Thompson made her acting debut as Jack Nicholson's granddaughter in The Bucket List. Thompson appeared in the Lifetime films, Amish Grace (2010) and Liz & Dick (2012), the latter of which she portrayed a fictional 10-year-old version of actress Kate Burton. Thompson's television credits include Prime Video's Gortimer Gibbon's Life on Normal Street and The Kicks, ABC's Speechless, and Showtime's Shameless.

In 2023, Thompson landed the role of Annie in Black Girl Missing, a true-crime film produced by Lifetime as part of its "Ripped from the Headlines" series. She also starred opposite Travis Burns, as the romantic lead of Lifetime's Ladies of the '80s: A Divas Christmas, starring Loni Anderson, Morgan Fairchild, Linda Gray, Donna Mills, and Nicollette Sheridan.

== Filmography ==
Film and television roles
Year	Title	Role	Notes
2007	The Bucket List	Edward's granddaughter	
2010	Amish Grace	Hannah	Television film
2012	Liz & Dick	Kate Burton (age 10)	Television film
2015	Gortimer Gibbon's Life on Normal Street	Samantha	Episode: "Ranger and the Supercharged Championship"
2016	The Kicks	Sara	4 episodes
2017	Speechless	Elle	Episode: "S-u-r-Surprise"
2021	Shameless	Kelly	Episode: "NIMBY"
2023	Black Girl Missing	Annie	Television film
2023	Ladies of the '80s: A Divas Christmas	Nell	Television film
