= Kalizma =

Luxury yacht, built 1906

Kalizma is a luxury private motor yacht with a history that dates back to 1906. The yacht was once owned by the Hollywood actors Elizabeth Taylor and Richard Burton.

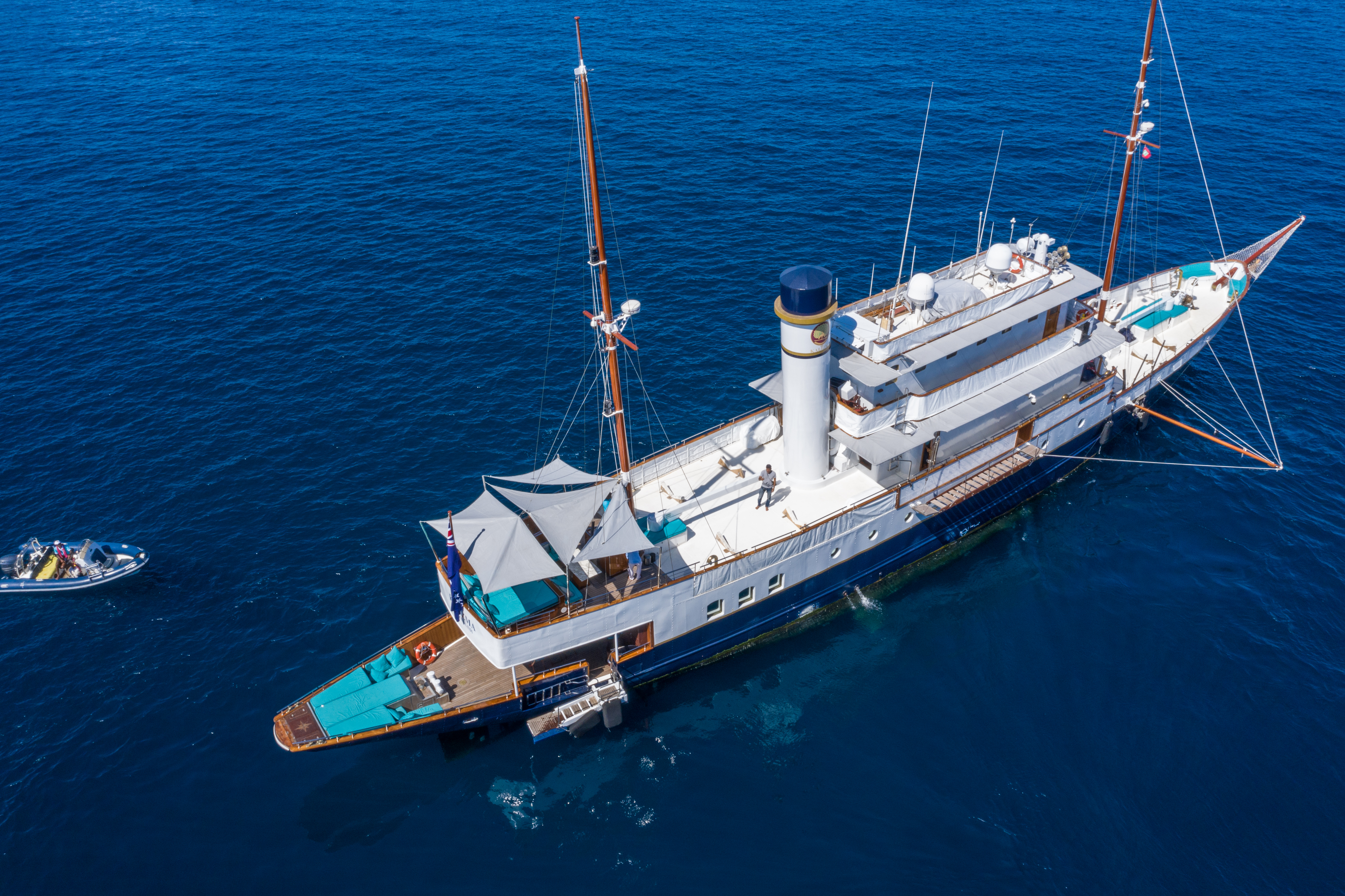
Kalizma from above History: Built in / 1906; Builder / Ramage & Ferguson, Scotland; Naval Architect / G.L. Watson & Co. Ltd.; Names / Minona, Cortynia, Odysseia and Kalizma; Major Refits / 1967/68, 1997/98/99, 2006, 2019/20; Status / Active; General Specifications: Length / 45.75m (150.97'); Beam / 6.32 m (20 ft 9 in); Draft / 3.60 m (11 ft 10 in); Speed / 10-12 knots; Capacity / 10; Crew onboard / 10

== History and Ownership ==
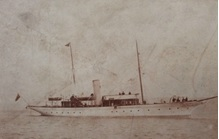
SY Minona

S/Y Minona (now Kalizma) was commissioned and built in 1906 as a luxury private yacht for Robert Stewart, previous owner of Kirkliston Distillery and prominent Scottish estate owner. Steward was also noted in history as being Vice Commodore of the Royal Eastern Yacht Club. Built to the highest standards, the Minona was designed by G.L. Watson & Co. built by Ramage & Ferguson, Leith, Scotland. Minona served in the British Royal Navy in WWI and WWII and in 1967 was bought by Richard Burton as a gift to Elizabeth Taylor, which he famously signed the ownership papers Richard Taylor. The couple re-christened her as Kalizma, an acronym for their three daughters' names, Kate, Liza and Maria.

=== World War I ===
Under the ownership of George Coats, 1st Baron Glentanar, she was offered to render services during World War I for the British Royal Navy. Minona went into service in October 1914 as an auxiliary patrol Vessel and was equipped with armaments- 2-6 pound guns, 1-6pdr AA to aid in wartime efforts to fend off enemy U-boats. At the end of the war, the Minona was discharged from her wartime duties on June 6, 1919.

=== Between 1919 and 1939 ===
During this period Minona's notable owners included Major Andrew Coats, brother of G. Coats and Admirable of the Mudhook Yacht Club. Following the passing of Major Coats, she was acquired in 1930 by Sir Charles MacIver, member of the Yacht Racing Association Council, Royal Yacht Squadron and crew member of the 1908 Olympic silver medal-winning yacht Mouchette.

=== World War II ===
By the end of 1939, the SY Minona was requisitioned by the British Admiralty and became the H.M.S. Minona. The H.M.S. Minona served as the flagship and base for His Majesty's Deep Sea Rescue Tug Services at Campbeltown, situated on Mull of Kintyre, Scotland, until December 1945.

=== Post War ===
On being relieved from wartime duties, Minona resumed her role as a private luxury steam yacht. She was renamed Cortynia in 1947 and again to S/Y Oddyseia in 1947. The yacht underwent a significant refit converting her engine from steam to diesel between 1954 and 1955.

=== 1960s ===
The mid-1960s saw the MY Odysseia (now Kalizma) make headlines when Richard Burton acquired the yacht as a gift for his wife and actress Elizabeth Taylor. The couple had initially chartered the Odysseia to sail around Portofino during May 1967. On acquisition later that year, the classic yacht was subsequently re-christened the Kalizma. An acronym derived from the names of their three daughters - Kate, Liza and Maria.

Richard Burton had reportedly bought the yacht for $192,000 and had spent twice as much having her refitted with new interiors. Elizabeth Taylor had hired Arthur Barbosa to redesign the interiors of the Kalizma. Post refit, the classic yacht adorned an exquisite art collection that included works by Monet, Van Gogh and Picasso, in addition to an extensive library as per the taste of her owners.

Kalizma served as a luxurious floating home to the famous couple. It was on board the Kalizma where Richard Burton presented Elizabeth Taylor with two of the most exquisite jewels. In 1968 Richard Burton presented Elizabeth Taylor with the 33.19-carat Krupp Diamond, also known as the Elizabeth Taylor Diamond. He gifted the diamond to Elizabeth Taylor on board the Kalizma whilst moored in the Thames, London.

The second and most notable of jewels gifted by Richard Burton to Elizabeth Taylor was the famous 69.42- carat diamond in 1969. Initially referred to as the 'Cartier Diamond', Richard Burton bought from Cartier for a record-setting price of $1.1 Million. The Cartier Diamond was subsequently called the Taylor-Burton Diamond. The 69.42-carat diamond took three weeks to reach the Burton's on board the Kalizma, anchored at Port Hercules, Monaco.

=== 1970 to date ===
Kalizma went through a series of owners after the 1970s, including Peter de Savary and Vijay Mallya. The yacht was acquired in 2019 by Shirish Saraf, and undertook an extensive refit in 2020 to restore the classic yacht. It was reflagged in the Cook Islands.

She has been referred to as the "Greatest superyacht of Hollywood History", and in 2021 the classic yacht was ranked amongst the top 100 Superyachts in Asia-Pacific.

On 21 May 2022, in London, at the 17th annual edition of the BOAT International World Superyacht Awards. The Kalizma was announced the winner of a "Judges' Special Award" and was nominated for the " Best Rebuilt Superyacht Award".

In April 2023, the Kalizma was involved in a shooting incident in the Gulf of Aden after the ship's security crew reportedly mistook the Yemeni Coast Guard for pirates. One coast guard officer was killed, according to maritime intelligence. However, Saraf denied the reports and maintained that the first shots were fired by real pirates.

== Distinguished personalities onboard ==
Among some of the celebrity guests entertained by Elizabeth Taylor and Richard Burton on board the Kalizma were Rex Harrison, Rachel Roberts, and Tennessee Williams and also included the likes of Royalty, such as Prince Rainier III and Princess Grace of Monaco.

Almost a decade later, the Kalizma also played host to Peter de Savary's royal guest Prince Andrew, during America's Cup Challenge in 1983.
