= Stan Zimmerman =

American television producer

- Occupations: Television producer Director; Screenwriter
- Known for: Gilmore Girls
- Notable work: The Golden Girls; Roseanne; Gilmore Girls; Rita Rocks
- Website: www.zimmermanstan.com

Stan Zimmerman is an American television producer, director and screenwriter. Zimmerman has been a scriptwriter for such television series as The Golden Girls, Roseanne and Gilmore Girls and the 1996 feature film A Very Brady Sequel. Zimmerman is also the creator and executive producer of the sitcom Rita Rocks.

== Career ==
Together with Berg, he also wroteThe Brady Bunch Movie, though not credited, and rewrote the TV movie Annie for ABC. In 2023, Zimmerman and Berg co-wrote the movie Ladies of the '80s: A Divas Christmas, starring Loni Anderson, Morgan Fairchild, Linda Gray, Donna Mills, and Nicollette Sheridan.

Other television writing credits include Brothers, Just Our Luck, George Burns Comedy Week, Hooperman, Something Wilder, Fame, and Wanda at Large. Zimmerman also directed the music video for the song "All I Want" by pop band Whore's Mascara. The song was nominated for three Pill Awards, including Best Video and Best Director, and had a cameo appearance by Laverne Cox.

Zimmerman appeared on Bravo's 2005 reality show Situation: Comedy, as TV host/showrunner. The show was produced by Sean Hayes.

In 2024, Indigo River Publishing released Zimmerman's memoir, "The Girls: From Golden to Gilmore".

In theater, Zimmerman directed "Gemini" (Celebration Theatre), "Spike Heels" (Actors Circle Theatre), "A Tuna Christmas" (Theater Asylum), "Entertaining Mr Sloane" (The Actors Company Theatre), "Blink & You Might Miss Me" (Theatre Asylum), "Daughter Of" (3 Clubs Lounge), "Warm Cheese" (Studio C), "Synthesis" (Dorie Theatre), "Pledge" (McCadden Place Theatre, Dorie Theatre), "Pinata" (Lounge Theatre) and a revival of Justin Tanner's "Heartbreak Help" (Dorie Theatre), starring Tony winner Marissa Jaret Winokur, Melissa Peterman, Teresa Ganzel and Sarah Gilman. He directed and co-wrote, in collaboration with Christian McLaughlin, "Meet & Greet" (Elephant Space), "Yes, Virginia" (Studio C, Dorie Theatre, Judson Theatre Company), "Have A Good One" (Dorie Theatre) and the workshop productions of "It's On!", the TV theme song musical (Falcon Theatre, NYMF).

He created and has been acting in Right Before I Go., his suicide awareness play. He's been performing it across America with high school and college students, alongside such actors as Virginia Madsen, Hill Harper, and Vanessa Williams. Zimmerman has also directed nine iterations of his LatinX version of '"The Diary of Anne Frank"'.

In the 2020s, Zimmerman and Berg cowrote the play Silver Foxes (originally conceived as a television series). The play is based on the documentary Gen Silent, about LGBT seniors forced to live in the closet to handle bureaucratic discrimination. Described as a "gay male Golden Girls," it has played in theaters across the US.

== Filmography ==
=== Film ===
- A Very Brady Sequel (1996, feature film)
- Christmas Bounty (2013)
- Ladies of the '80s: A Divas Christmas (2023)

=== Television ===
- Brothers
- Fame
- Gilmore Girls
- George Burns Comedy Week
- The Golden Girls
- Hooperman
- Just Our Luck
- Pauly
- Roseanne
- Rita Rocks
- Something Wilder
- Secs & EXECS (2017)
- Skirtchasers (2016)
- Wanda at Large
- Brunch Date (2021)

== Awards and recognition ==
Stan Zimmerman and his associate James Berg have received two Writers Guild of America nominations, one for The Golden Girls, "Rose's Mother" and the other for the lesbian kiss episode of Roseanne, "Don't Ask, Don't Tell".

He also received several awards for his work in theatre, such as "Best Director" for "Blink & You Might Miss Me" by BroadwayWorld.com, Hollywood Fringe Encore Producers' Award and 3 StageSceneLA Awards, including Best Director for "Meet & Greet", 3 StageSceneLA Awards, including Best Director for "Spike Heels", 7 StageSceneLA Awards, including Best Director for "Entertaining Mr Sloane", and Hollywood Fringe Encore Producers' Award for "Suicide Notes". In May 2026, The Tank theatre awarded Stan "Artist of the Year" at their annual gala in NYC.

== Private life ==
Stan Zimmerman is openly gay, as is his business associate James Berg. He is Jewish.
