= Just Our Luck =

1983 American sitcom

- Created by: Lawrence Gordon; Charles Gordon
- Developed by: Rick Kellard; Bob Comfort
- Written by: Lawrence Gordon; Charles Gordon; Tony Colvin & Scott S. Gorden
- Directed by: John Astin; Alan Bergmann; Bruce Bilson; Bob Sweeney
- Starring: T. K. Carter; Richard Gilliland; Ellen Maxted; Rod McCary; Richard Schaal; Hamilton Camp; Leonard Simon
- Composers: Barry De Vorzon; Joseph Conlan
- Country of origin: United States
- Original language: English
- No. of seasons: 1
- No. of episodes: 13 (2 unaired)

Production
- Producers: Lawrence Gordon; Charles Gordon; Bob Comfort; Rick Kellard
- Running time: 30 minutes
- Production companies: Lawrence Gordon Productions; Lorimar Productions

Original release
- Network: ABC
- Release: September 20 – December 27, 1983

Just Our Luck is an American sitcom that aired on ABC for 13 episodes (two were unaired) from September 20 to December 27, 1983. Created by brothers Lawrence and Charles Gordon, it was considered a modernized version of the 1960s sitcom I Dream of Jeannie and starred Richard Gilliland as a mild-mannered TV weatherman for KPOX-TV, and T. K. Carter as a hip, fun-loving 3,000-year-old genie who is freed by Gilliland after being imprisoned in his bottle for nearly two centuries.

The series was produced by Lorimar Productions, and initially promoted by ABC as one of its new ambitious comedies along with Webster. Just Our Luck was created to compete against The A-Team on NBC but earned low ratings for much of its run. It was poorly received by critics, however, and was the subject of controversy when the NAACP charged the show with promoting negative stereotypes of African-Americans. The NAACP originally campaigned to have the show removed but later settled for a degree of creative control in the show's development. This included changes to Carter's dialogue, the hiring of black staff writers and the addition of Leonard Simon to the cast. The show was cancelled after three months.

== Plot ==
Keith Burrows (Richard Gilliland) is a young TV weatherman working at KPOX-TV Channel 6 in Venice, California. One day while jogging on the boardwalk, he passes a flea market and bumps into one of the tables causing an old green bottle to fall off and crack. Burrows is forced to buy the bottle and brings it home with him. Later that night, his cat breaks the bottle and releases Shabu, a 3,000 year-old genie. The genie tells Burrows that he had been imprisoned in the bottle for 196 years and offers to serve Burrows for 2,000 years or until his death, in Shabu's words, "whichever comes first".

Although the grateful Shabu decides to abide by the traditional role of a genie, he is somewhat disappointed by Burrows' modest lifestyle, having lived in royal palaces with historical figures such as Cleopatra, King Arthur and Napoleon Bonaparte. Much of the show's humor came from Shabu using his powers to play practical jokes on Burrows and generally causing him embarrassment in daily life. He did, however, sometimes help Burrows with social and work related problems. In one episode, he helps liven up a party thrown to impress the station manager so Burrows could keep his job. At times, Shabu's efforts would backfire. In the episode "Dr. Jekyll & Mr. Burrows", for example, Shabu gives Burrows "a jolt of self confidence", causing him to become extremely egotistical, self-centered and obnoxious.

The pair would frequently interact with Burrows' co-workers at KPOX-TV; program director Meagan Huxley (Ellen Maxted), her fiancée and station manager Nelson Marriott (Rod McCary), weatherman Professor Bob (Hamilton Camp) and Burrows' neighbor Chuck (Richard Schaal). Jim Dexter (Leonard Simon), a news anchorman, was introduced later in the season.

== History ==
The series was initially conceived by brothers Lawrence and Charles Gordon as a modern-day television adaptation of Aladdin and the Magic Lamp. The two were both experienced television producers and, in association with Lorimar, were supported by the American Broadcasting Company hoping for a viable challenger to run against rival network NBC's The A-Team.

Throughout the 1970s and early 1980s, ABC had dominated Tuesday nights with shows such as Happy Days, Laverne & Shirley and similar programming. When The A-Team debuted in the spring of 1983, however, the network was forced to regroup. Happy Days, then in its final season, was moved back half an hour to 8:30 p.m. and a new series, Just Our Luck, took its place. It was one of two shows starring an African-American lead, the other being Webster, to make its debut in the 1983 fall season. Just Our Luck was promoted by the network as one of its new ambitious comedy series and was the focus of memorable and humorous advertisements. In one of these, Shabu appeared with Arthur "Fonzie" Fonzarelli of Happy Days and shrunk a Mr. T look-alike to the size of a midget.

Just Our Luck was T. K. Carter's first starring role in a television series. Carter was very enthusiastic about the series and at a later press conference told journalists that he wanted Shabu to be seen, in regards to younger viewers, as "the first black superhero". He later objected to comparisons of I Dream of Jeannie and responded to critics charges of racial stereotyping,

Shabu doesn't have a master because he doesn't believe in masters....I made it clear that I won't do that jive routine, acting like some cat in a black El Dorado, drinking a Kool-Aid daiquiri with a hat as big as a house....When Shabu pops out of the bottle, he's wearing a Bill Blass raw silk suit. You're not going to see me wearing a lot of jewelry and stuff.

His co-star Richard Gilliland, who had appeared in a string of cancelled series from the final season of McMillan to the short-lived follow up to his appearance in the miniseries Little Women, was optimistic about the show's chances. After the cancellation of Little Women, he was reluctant to audition for the show at first but agreed to read for the part of Keith Burrows at the last minute. John Astin, a fellow cast member from Operation Petticoat, directed the pilot episode. In regards to the relationship between the two characters, Gilliland commented "I think the two characters will have a dual dependency. In the future, Keith will become more magical and Shabu more mortal. Figuratively, Shabu is the master. I want to get rid of him but I can't. I'm stuck with him."

== Reception ==
Just Our Luck premiered on September 20, 1983, as part of ABC's Tuesday night lineup, and featured Tab Hunter in a cameo appearance. Almost immediately after its first episode, it was panned by many TV critics.

The series would continue to receive generally poor reviews from many TV critics throughout the season. These were mostly complaints of the writing being uninteresting or clichéd as well as unfavorable comparisons to the 1960s series I Dream of Jeannie. Some noted Carter's character as being similar to the type of "streetwise" character acting often played by African-Americans on television and the racial nature of the relationship between the two main characters. One reviewer, Kathryn Olney of Mother Jones Magazine, compared it to a 1980s version of Amos 'n' Andy. Baird Searles decried the series as "cutesy drivel". A few, however, were more supportive, such as Stuart Bykofsky of The Day, who reported "an occasional spark of wit that is very easy to take". Richard Corliss from Time also wrote Just Our Luck "scores as hip, underplayed farce".

Chuck Gordon, one of the show's four executive producers, said "When we wrote the script, there was no dialect. T.K. designed the role. He was allowed to play himself." The show's star, T.K. Carter, supported the producer's and commented on his character at an October 22 press conference.

I don't feel this character is racially stereotypical. I think he is 70 percent of my own personality and 30 percent Shabu. He's a classy character.

The NAACP objected to the series, claiming a black character being portrayed as a thankful servant to a white male was offensive, and called for a national boycott of ABC until it was taken off the air. Willis Edwards, president of the Beverly Hills-Hollywood NAACP, stated Shabu was "an embarrassing and degrading portrayal of a black male in the 80s." In October 1983, the organization announced that ABC had conceded to their demands and allowed the NAACP partial creative control over the series. Among the changes they made included removing the term of "master" and "servant" in the show dialogue, restricting so-called "jive talk" from Carter, the hiring of African-American writers and actor Leonard Simon to play anchorman Jim Dexter.

Just Our Luck attempted to recover from the bad publicity and brought in Roy Orbison, Dr. Joyce Brothers and Wink Martindale as guest stars. Though it did find some appeal among children, particularly for its special effects, it failed to win the 18-49 demographic and was consistently beaten in head-to-head competition by The A-Team throughout its run. In spite of its efforts, ABC canceled the series after eleven episodes.

The series was broadcast overseas in late 1984 and 1985 in countries as far away as Malaysia and Australia. The show was unable to escape its reputation, such as Philippa Hawker of The Age finding the main characters unappealing, referring to Shabu as "your standard irritating genie" and Burrows as "a rat". Just Our Luck was one of the series featured in TV Turkeys (1987) by Kevin Allman. The series also aired in the United Kingdom on ITV in 1984.

== Theme song ==
Klymaxx recorded Barry De Vorzon and Joseph Conlan's theme song for their 1984 album Meeting in the Ladies Room.

== Characters ==
- Shabu (T. K. Carter), a 3,000-year-old genie
- Keith Burrows (Richard Gilliland), a good-natured, earnest but somewhat dull television weatherman
- Meagan Huxley (Ellen Maxted), the station's program director
- Nelson Marriott (Rod McCary), station manager
- Chuck (Richard Schaal), Keith's neighbor
- Professor Bob (Hamilton Camp), weatherman
- Jim Dexter (Leonard Simon), news anchor

== Episodes ==
Production codes were taken from the U.S. Copyright Office.

No.	Title	Directed by	Written by	Original release date	Prod. code
1	"Pilot"	John Astin	Rick Kellard & Bob Comfort	September 20, 1983	N/A
A young television reporter finds a mysterious green bottle which contains a genie. The genie is none too happy with his new master, having previously served Cleopatra, King Arthur and Napoleon, and soon shows a predilection for practical jokes at the worst possible times.
2	"The Shabelles"	John Astin	James Berg & Stan Zimmerman	September 27, 1983	172402
Shabu clones himself in a vocal quartet in order to enter a talent contest and win money so Keith can go on vacation.
3	"Transition"	John Astin	Michael Russnow	October 4, 1983	172401
Shabu tries to inspire Keith to apply for a promotion by inspiring him with visions of other great Americans.
4	"Photo Finish"	John Astin	Barry Vigon & Danny Jacobson	October 18, 1983	172405
When Nelson brags about his racing victories, Shabu forces him to relive the marathon races where he cheated in order to win.
5	"Uncle Harry"	John Astin	Linda Morris & Vic Rauseo	October 25, 1983	172403
Shabu wants to surprise Keith on his birthday, so he conjures up his long-lost Uncle Harry. Unfortunately, the man he transports is the wrong Harry, and the old man promptly wanders away before he can be sent back.
6	"Something Alien This Way Comes"	Alan Bergmann	Tony Colvin & Scott S. Gorden	November 1, 1983	172406
Shabu accidentally demonstrates his magic while weatherman Professor Bob is watching and becomes convinced that the genie is an alien from another planet.
7	"Englebert Humpercricket"	Unknown	Linda Morris , Vic Rauseo	November 8, 1983	172410
Shabu decides that the party Keith is throwing for his station manager is too dull, so he decides to use magic to spice it up.
8	"No Holds Barred"	Unknown	Tony Colvin, Scott S. Gorden	November 22, 1983	172408
Keith must fight a professional wrestler who takes a dim view of the story he did on the sport for his television station.
9	"Wedding Bell Shablues"	Unknown	Unknown	December 6, 1983	172404
One day after being challenged to find a girlfriend without using his magic, Shabu announces he's engaged to a beautiful woman.
10	"Ballad of Dead Eye Dick"	Unknown	Unknown	December 13, 1983	172409
Shabu conjures up an unusual witness when he and Keith are tried on assault charges.
11	"Keith's Car Crusade"	Unknown	Unknown	December 27, 1983	172412
Keith agrees to do commercials for a disreputable used car dealership and is harassed by customers who bought lemons because of his advertisements.
12	"King Kahommi's Curse"	N/A	N/A	Unaired	172407
Keith finds a royal scarab with a curse on it.
13	"Dr. Jekyll & Mr. Burrows"	N/A	N/A	Unaired	172411
Shabu's plan to give Keith a jolt of self-confidence backfires when his master emerges from the spell as an incredibly obnoxious, self-centered cretin.

== US television ratings ==
Season	Episodes	Start date	End date	Nielsen rank	Nielsen rating
1983-84	13	September 20, 1983	December 27, 1983	75	12.7 (Note: Tied with the "CBS Wednesday Night Movie" (special))
