= Travis Burns (actor) =

Australian actor and model

- Born: 23 April 1991 (age 35); Melbourne, Australia
- Occupations: Actor; model
- Years active: 2013–present
- Spouse: Emma Lane (m. 2017)
- Children: 1

Travis Robert Burns (born 23 April 1991) is an Australian actor and model. He first came to prominence with his role in the American action-drama television series, SAF3 (2013). He played Tyler Brennan in the long-running Australian television soap opera Neighbours from 2015 to 2019. After leaving Neighbours, Burns starred in the romance film Sunrise in Heaven (2019) and television films The Wrong Boy Next Door (2019), The Christmas Listing (2020), and Save the Wedding (2021).

== Career ==
=== Acting ===
Burns's first acting role was in SAF3, an American action-drama television series that follows the daily challenges of the Sea, Air, and Fire ("SAF") divisions of the Malibu Fire Department. He appeared in eight episodes of the drama as lifeguard Chase Robertson. SAF3 was primarily filmed in South African locations such as Cape Town and Camps Bay Beach, and the series premiered on The CW in September 2013. Burns later relocated to the United States to further his acting career, auditioning for roles in films such as The Fault in Our Stars (2014), and Terminator Genisys (2015), but was unsuccessful.

On 30 October 2014, the Neighbours official website announced that Burns had been cast as Tyler Brennan, the younger brother of established character Mark Brennan (Scott McGregor). Burns, who was based in the United States at the time, was asked to audition for the part in early 2014. After securing the role, he relocated to Australia. Speaking about his casting, Burns said: "When you score a role on a show as iconic as Neighbours, you don't say no. It's especially cool to be joining the show in its 30th-anniversary year. I feel like I've arrived at the perfect time." He had previously met McGregor through their modelling agency and believed they had developed a "brotherly spark" through that connection, which he felt helped him secure the role. He also believed the role was meant to be his as his young nephew also shares the name Tyler. Burns made his screen debut as Tyler on 6 February 2015. Burns's partner, Emma Lane, portrayed Courtney Grixti from 2015 to 2018, a recurring character in the series. The two characters were romantically linked during the series' 32nd season. Complementing his role in Neighbours, Burns has appeared as Tyler in three spin-offs of the series; Summer Stories, Pipe Up, and Neighbours vs Time Travel.

In December 2017, Fiona Byrne of the Herald Sun reported that Burns would be leaving Neighbours in the coming months to pursue other acting roles in the United States. His exit scenes aired on 27 February 2018, but he reprised the role for a brief return in October 2018. Following his exit from Neighbours, Burns made a short film with his former co-star Felix Mallard called Money Is Just a Barbell. Burns then appeared in the 2019 romance drama film Sunrise in Heaven, an adaptation of the Jan Gilbert Hurst novel His Sunrise My Sunset. That same year, he starred in The Wrong Boy Next Door on the Lifetime Movie Network, alongside Vivica A. Fox who also produced the film, and played the role of Prince Jack in A Christmas Princess, alongside Shein Mompremier.

In 2020, Burns starred in The Christmas Listing, his second holiday film and first to air on Lifetime. The following year, he starred in the romance film Save the Wedding with Kacey Landoll; appeared in three episodes of the romance series Trevor and the Virgin; and starred in Jacob Johnston's horror thriller Dreamcatcher. The film features an ensemble cast, including Zachary Gordon, whose characters attempt to avenge the death of their friend at a music festival, but find themselves being stalked by the same killer. Burns next appeared in two more films for Lifetime, the holiday-themed thriller mystery It's Beginning to Look A Lot Like Murder (2022), and Ladies of the '80s: A Divas Christmas (2023), opposite Taylor Ann Thompson, Loni Anderson, Morgan Fairchild, Linda Gray, Donna Mills, and Nicollette Sheridan. In 2024, he portrayed the fictional rockstar David Ferris as the male lead in the Passionflix romance film Lick, an adaption of the Kylie Scott novel of the same name.

=== Modelling ===
Aside from acting, Burns is a model by profession. In September 2015, Burns was featured naked in a Cosmopolitan magazine centrefold, as part of Neighbours 30th anniversary celebrations, but also to raise funds for cancer research. Later that month, Burns was listed as one of Cleo magazine's top–30 "Bachelor of the Year" nominees for 2015.

== Personal life ==
Burns was born on 23 April 1991, in Bacchus Marsh, a regional centre of Victoria, Australia. Burns has been in a relationship with model, actress and fellow Neighbours star, Emma Lane, since 2013; in March 2016, the couple announced their engagement. They married on 16 December 2017 on the Bellarine Peninsula. In July 2023, Burns announced that he and Lane were expecting their first child in December. Their child was born in November 2023.

== Filmography ==
=== Film ===
Year	Title	Role	Notes	Ref(s)
2020	Sunrise in Heaven	Teen Steve	Direct-to-video	
2021	Dreamcatcher	Dylan 'DJ Dreamcatcher'	Video on demand	
2024	Lick	David Ferris	Passionflix adaptation	

=== Television ===
Year	Title	Role	Notes
2013	SAF3	Chase Robertson	Series regular; 8 episodes
2015–2019	Neighbours	Tyler Brennan	714 episodes
2016	Neighbours: Summer Stories	Tyler Brennan	Web series; 2 episodes
2016–2017	Neighbours: Pipe Up	Tyler Brennan	Web series; 12 episodes
2017	Neighbours vs. Time Travel	Tyler Brennan	Web series; 2 episodes
2019	The Wrong Boy Next Door	John	Television film
2019	A Christmas Princess	Prince Jack	Television film
2020	The Christmas Listing	Chad Everest	Television film
2021	Save the Wedding	Tyler	Television film
2022	It's Beginning to Look a Lot Like Murder	Matt	Television film
2023	Trapped in the Cabin	Nathan Andrews	Television film
2023	Ladies of the '80s: A Divas Christmas	Alex	Television film
