= White Hot: The Mysterious Murder of Thelma Todd =

1991 American television movie

- VHS cover
- Genre: Biographical drama
- Based on: Hot Toddy by Andy Edmonds
- Teleplay by: Robert E. Thompson; Lindsay Harrison
- Story by: Robert E. Thompson
- Directed by: Paul Wendkos
- Starring: Loni Anderson
- Music by: Mark Snow
- Country of origin: United States
- Original language: English

Production
- Executive producers: Frank von Zerneck; Robert M. Sertner
- Producers: Julie Anne Weitz; Gregory Prange
- Cinematography: Chuck Arnold
- Editors: Michael J. Sheridan; Stephen Adrianson
- Running time: 94 minutes
- Production companies: Neufeld-Keating Productions; Sandyhook Productions; Von Zerneck-Sertner Films

Original release
- Network: NBC
- Release: May 5, 1991

White Hot: The Mysterious Murder of Thelma Todd is a 1991 American television film directed by Paul Wendkos and written by Robert E. Thompson and Lindsay Harrison. Based on the 1989 non-fiction book Hot Toddy: The True Story of Hollywood's Most Sensational Murder by Andy Edmonds, the film is about the life of Hollywood comedic actress Thelma Todd, whose 1935 death was ruled accidental but always has been controversial. Loni Anderson stars as Todd, alongside Maryedith Burrell, Robert Davi, Paul Dooley, Linda Kelsey, and John O'Hurley. It premiered on NBC on May 5, 1991.

== Cast ==
- Loni Anderson as Thelma Todd
- Maryedith Burrell as Patsy Kelly
- Robert Davi as Lucky Luciano
- Paul Dooley as Hal Roach
- Linda Kelsey as Anne "Mac" McMahon
- John O'Hurley as Pat DiCicco
- Dakin Matthews as D.A. Buron Fitts
- Scott Paulin as Louis Marsden
- Lawrence Pressman as Roland West
- Lois Smith as Alice Todd
- Robin Strasser as Jewel Carmen
- Allan Wasserman as Medical Examiner
- James Paradise as Vince
- Mort Sertner as Mr. Brill
- Marla Adams as Mrs. Ford

== Release ==
The film was released by itself and as a double feature with the television film The Jayne Mansfield Story, also starring Anderson.
