= T. K. Carter =

American actor (1956–2026)

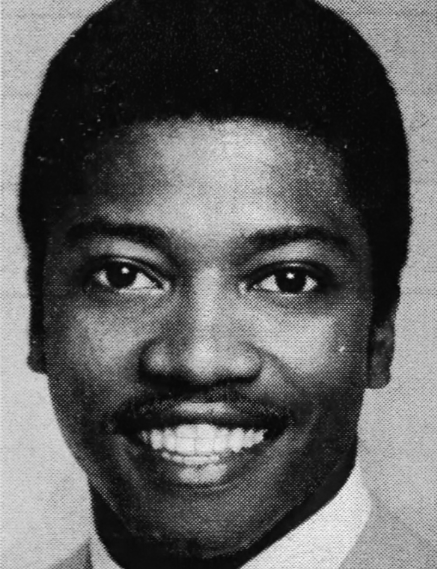
- Carter in 1983
- Born: Thomas Kent Carter; December 18, 1956; New York City, U.S.
- Died: January 9, 2026 (aged 69); Duarte, California, U.S.
- Occupation: Actor
- Years active: 1976–2023

Thomas Kent Carter (December 18, 1956 – January 9, 2026) was an American actor best known for his roles in the films Corvette Summer (1978), Southern Comfort (1981), The Thing (1982), Doctor Detroit (1983), Runaway Train (1985), Space Jam (1996) and The Corner (2000), as well as for the TV series Just Our Luck (as the series' lead), Punky Brewster, The Sinbad Show, Dave, and Good Morning, Miss Bliss, also known as Saved by the Bell: The Junior High Years. He was also the voice of the animated character Anthony Julian from 1985 to 1988 on the series Jem.

== Early life ==
Thomas Kent Carter was born in New York City on December 18, 1956. He grew up in the San Gabriel Valley area of Southern California.

== Career ==
In films, he was mostly known for his many comedic performances, such as the street-smart Chester in Seems Like Old Times and the karaoke-singing Iceman in Ski Patrol (1990). He is also known for playing slightly nervous characters, such as the rollerskating chef Nauls in John Carpenter's The Thing (1982), as well as the unfortunate National Guardsman, Cribbs, in Walter Hill's Southern Comfort (1981).

On television, he was known for playing Michael "Mike" Fulton, an elementary schoolteacher, on the NBC series Punky Brewster (1985–1986) and Mylo Williams on the Disney Channel series Good Morning, Miss Bliss (1988). Carter is also well known for playing the role of drug addicted Gary McCullough in the HBO miniseries The Corner (2000), a performance that The Boston Globe said "perfectly captures the gentleness and passivity that can be addiction's easiest conquest". Carter's first starring role on television was on Just Our Luck (1983).

His acting debut was on an episode of Police Woman. Carter also made appearances on Good Times (1977–1978), The Sinbad Show (1993), The Steve Harvey Show (1996–1998), A Different World (1993), and in the television films Polly (1989) and its 1990 sequel.

== Personal life ==
Carter was married to Sandra Collier for 15 years before she died from colon cancer around 2025.

Carter died at his home in Duarte, California, on January 9, 2026, at the age of 69.

== Filmography ==
Year	Title	Role	Notes
1977–1978	Good Times	Head	2 episodes
1978	The Waltons	Jody Foster	1 episode
1978	Corvette Summer	Car Wash Employee	
1978	Youngblood	Bubba Cosell	
1978	The Jeffersons	Richard	1 episode
1980	Seems Like Old Times	Chester	
1980	The Hollywood Knights	Doo Wop Street Singer	
1980	Seed of Innocence	Captain	
1981	Underground Aces	Dee Jay	
1981	Southern Comfort	Cribbs	
1982	The Thing	Nauls	
1983	Just Our Luck	Shabu	13 episodes, main role
1983	Carpool	Otis	
1983	Doctor Detroit	Diavolo Washington	
1984	Turbo Teen	Alex (voice)	13 episodes, main role
1985–1986	Punky Brewster	Mike Fulton	24 episodes
1985	Runaway Train	Dave Prince	
1985	Jem	Anthony Julian (voice)	
1985	The Transformers	Rocksteady (voice)	1 episode
1987	He's My Girl	Reggie/Regina	
1987	Amazon Women on the Moon	Host (segment "Silly Pate")	
1988	Good Morning, Miss Bliss	Mylo Williams	13 episodes
1989	Polly	George Dodds	TV movie
1989	227	Gary Hunt	1 episode
1990	Ski Patrol	Iceman	
1990	Polly: Comin' Home	George Dodds	TV movie
1991	A Rage in Harlem	Smitty	
1992	Family Matters	Ty, Laura's Guardian Angel	1 episode
1993	A Different World	Darnell Gaines	1 episode
1993	The Sinbad Show	Clarence Hull	24 episodes, main role
1993	A Cool Like That Christmas	Dead Boy	TV movie
1995	What a Cartoon!	Sledgehammer O'Possum, Santa Claus, Steve, Lion (voice)	3 episodes
1996	Space Jam	Monstar Nawt (voice)	
1996–1998	The Steve Harvey Show	T-Bone	4 episodes
1997	Moesha	T.K. Smooth	1 episode
1998	The Gregory Hines Show	Roger Baron	1 episode
1998	Oh Yeah! Cartoons	Various voices	
1998	The Nanny	Ty	1 episode
1999	My Favorite Martian	Lenny	
1999	NYPD Blue	Derrick	1 episode
2000	The Corner	Gary McCullough	6 episodes
2003	Baadasssss!	Bill Cosby	
2005	Domino	Lester Kincaid	
2007	Everybody Hates Chris	Councilman Johnson	1 episode
2013	Love That Girl!	Immunique's father	1 episode
2016	How to Get Away with Murder	Thelonious Harkness	1 episode
2018	The Bobby Brown Story	Herbert Brown	TV film
2020	Stumptown	Lataurus Price	1 episode
2020	The Way Back	Russ Durrett	
2023	Dave	Cliff	5 episodes, recurring role
2023	The Company You Keep	Pike	3 episodes
