= Ladies of the '80s: A Divas Christmas =

Television film directed by Christie Will Wolf

- Genre: Comedy
- Written by: James Berg; Stan Zimmerman
- Directed by: Christie Will Wolf
- Starring: Loni Anderson; Morgan Fairchild; Linda Gray; Donna Mills; Nicollette Sheridan; Travis Burns; Taylor Ann Thompson; Christopher Atkins; Patrika Darbo; Scott Evans; Alec Mapa; Chloe Mills
- Music by: Steve Dorff
- Country of origin: United States
- Original language: English

Production
- Executive producer: Larry A. Thompson
- Producers: Robert G. Endara II; Ed Polgardy
- Cinematography: Robert Hayes
- Editor: Misty Talley
- Running time: 85 minutes
- Production companies: Larry Thompson Entertainment; StarScape Entertainment

Original release
- Network: Lifetime
- Release: December 2, 2023

Ladies of the '80s: A Divas Christmas is a 2023 American Christmas comedy television film directed by Christie Will Wolf, written by James Berg and Stan Zimmerman, and executive-produced by Larry A. Thompson. It stars Loni Anderson (in her final film before her death in 2025), Morgan Fairchild, Linda Gray, Donna Mills and Nicollette Sheridan as five glamorous soap opera divas as they reunite to shoot the final Christmas episode of their long-running former (fictional) series, The Great Lakes. The supporting cast includes Travis Burns and Taylor Ann Thompson as producer and soap director, Christopher Atkins, Patrika Darbo, Alec Mapa and Donna Mills' daughter, Chloe Mills.

It premiered on Lifetime as a part of It’s a Wonderful Lifetime holiday movie slate on December 2, 2023.

== Cast ==
- Loni Anderson as Lily Marlowe. Anderson played Jennifer Marlowe in the CBS sitcom WKRP in Cincinnati
- Morgan Fairchild as Margaux Roberts. A reference to her role of Jordan Roberts on the CBS prime time soap opera Falcon Crest
- Linda Gray as Lauren Ewing. Gray played Sue Ellen Ewing on Dallas
- Donna Mills as Dana Cunningham. Mills played Abby Cunningham on Knots Landing
- Nicollette Sheridan as Juliette Matheson. Sheridan played Paige Matheson on Knots Landing
- Travis Burns as Alex, the show's producer
- Taylor Ann Thompson as Nell, the show's director and Alex's college friend
- Christopher Atkins as Pete (Atkins played the character Peter Richards on Dallas)
- Patrika Darbo as Julie
- Alec Mapa as Jeffrey
- Chloe Mills as Dana's Daughter
- Scott Evans as Tommy Johnson
- Layne Herrin as Gary, Juliette's son
- David Michael Lewin as Mover
- Andreer Henderson as P.A.
- Aimee La Joie as Worker

== Production ==
The film was executive produced by Larry A. Thompson and written by James Berg and Stan Zimmerman. It was directed by Christie Will Wolf and filmed in Los Angeles in 2023. Loni Anderson, Morgan Fairchild, Linda Gray, Donna Mills and Nicollette Sheridan was cast as a lead characters in the movie. Travis Burns, Taylor Ann Thompson, Christopher Atkins, Patrika Darbo, Alec Mapa and Chloe Mills round out the cast. The film's theme song "Ladies of the 80's" was written by Steve Dorff and Michael Jay and is performed by 80's pop singer Tiffany. First-look photos were released on October 3, 2023. The official trailer was released on November 8, 2023.

Mills and Sheridan worked together on Knots Landing and Fairchild and Sheridan were both in Paper Dolls. Christopher Atkins appeared with Gray on Dallas.

== Reception ==
The film received positive reviews from critics. Jasmine Blu from TV Fanatic praised the performances and the production overall writing: "No one can quite deliver like veteran actresses, and there wasn't a single moment of this film that wasn't delightful."

== See also ==
- These Old Broads (2001) another made-for-television comedy film with a similar premise.
