= Something Wilder =

- Genre: Sitcom
- Created by: Lee Kalcheim; Barnet Kellman
- Starring: Gene Wilder; Hillary B. Smith; Ian Bottiglieri; Carl Michael Lindner; Jake Weber; Gregory Itzin; Raegan Kotz
- Opening theme: "You Brought a New Kind of Love to Me"
- Composers: Mason Daring; Ed Alton
- Country of origin: United States
- Original language: English
- No. of seasons: 1
- No. of episodes: 18 (3 unaired)

Production
- Executive producers: Barnet Kellman; Tom Anderson; Ruth Bennett
- Camera setup: Multi-camera
- Running time: 30 minutes
- Production companies: The Kellman Company; Warner Bros. Television

Original release
- Network: NBC
- Release: October 1, 1994 – June 13, 1995

Cast

Something Wilder is an American sitcom television series starring Gene Wilder that ran on NBC from October 1, 1994, to June 13, 1995. The series was created by Lee Kalcheim and Barnet Kellman. A total of 18 half-hour episodes were produced over one season.

== Synopsis ==
A fifty-something husband, Gene Bergman (Wilder), and his wife, Annie (Hillary B. Smith), who is in her thirties, are learning to cope with raising 4-year-old fraternal twin sons, Gabe and Sam (Ian Bottiglieri and Carl Michael Lindner). Sensitive, emotional Gene was especially unprepared for the prospect of fatherhood this much later in his life, and could not fathom how the generation gap was going to play out with the kids once they grew older. Sensible Annie pulled him through all the obstacles, and in the meantime, the Bergmans were just settling in for the joy of Sam and Gabe's innocent years. Gene ran an advertising agency with his partner, crabby best friend Jack Travis (Gregory Itzin), whose offices were located adjacent to both their homes. Jack, whose kids were grown, was at first unsure about Gene's newfound habit of dropping work frequently throughout the day to play with the twins, but eventually adjusted and sometimes found himself babysitting Sam and Gabe whenever some situation (usually comedic and slapstick) caused Gene and Annie to be away. Also working for the agency was Annie's irresponsible younger brother, Richie Wainwright (Jake Weber), who doted on the kids almost as much as Gene. Others seen were Annie's niece from another of her siblings, boy crazy teen Katy Mooney (Raegan Kotz), and Caleb (Cleavant Derricks), the neighborhood handyman.

The intended wit and charm of the show was drawn from Gene Wilder's comedic intuitiveness and the frantic mimicry and mugging he put on with his two young co-stars. Wilder and on-screen wife Hillary Bailey Smith also developed a "comedic supercouple" repertoire, as they often found themselves in situations ribbed with slapstick every week, slightly reminiscent of Desi Arnaz and Lucille Ball; at the same time, they were found to depict the smart, modern career couple of the 1990s. However, Something Wilder failed to catch on with viewers, which led to cancellation by March 1995.

== Cast ==
=== Main ===
- Gene Wilder as Gene Bergman
- Hillary B. Smith as Annie Bergman
- Ian Bottiglieri as Gabe Bergman
- Carl Michael Lindner as Sam Bergman
- Jake Weber as Richie Wainwright
- Gregory Itzin as Jack Travis
- Raegan Kotz as Katy Mooney

=== Recurring ===
- Cleavant Derricks as Caleb Attucks

=== Guest appearances ===
Alice Cooper guest starred in the fourteenth episode, "Hangin' With Mr. Cooper", when Gene unexpectedly finds himself cast in a television appearance promoting Cooper's new hit single. Marla Maples guest starred on the episode "Love Native American Style". In this episode, Gene takes a group of children on an Indian troop camping trip. Maples plays Donna Lorenzo, a divorced mother who goes along. Together, they demonstrate wrestling techniques and share a sleeping bag.

== Production ==
The series premiere of Something Wilder was delayed by a few weeks in the fall of 1994, as a result of casting issues. Jennifer Grey had originally won the role of Annie Bergman, and shot the first pilot; test audiences, however, disapproved of the age difference between her and Wilder. Grey was let go, but the search for her replacement proved more challenging than expected. Almost down to the wire, NBC then cast actress Hillary Bailey Smith for the role. Smith, who was playing the contract role of Nora Gannon on One Life to Live at the time, continued appearing on that show (despite the fact that OLTL was on a competing network, ABC) during the run of Something Wilder, and resumed the daytime role full time when Something Wilder was canceled.

== Episodes ==
No.	Title	Directed by	Written by	Original release date	Prod. code	Viewers (millions)
1	"Hell No, They Won't Go"	Barnet Kellman	Story by : Lee Kalcheim & Barnet Kellman; Teleplay by : Lee Kalcheim	October 1, 1994	456751	8.3
2	"All in the Game"	Barnet Kellman	Gail Honigberg	October 8, 1994	456752	7.5
3	"No Kids Allowed"	Barnet Kellman	Lee Kalcheim	October 15, 1994	456754	7.3
4	"Buster Beefy"	Barnet Kellman	Seth Kurland	October 22, 1994	456756	7.4
5	"Love, Native American Style"	Unknown	Alan Uger	December 6, 1994	456760	16.0
6	"Gotta Dance"	Unknown	Jennifer Glickman & Seth Kurland	December 13, 1994	456761	16.3
7	"Holy Water"	Barnet Kellman	James Berg & Stan Zimmerman	December 20, 1994	456757	14.4
8	"The Ex Files"	Barnet Kellman	Ruth Bennett	January 3, 1995	456762	18.6
9	"For the Boys"	Barnet Kellman	Mark Drop	January 10, 1995	456758	16.3
10	"Family Tie"	Barnet Kellman	Ruth Bennett & Tom Anderson	January 17, 1995	456759	13.7
11	"Sleepless in Stockbridge"	Unknown	James Berg & Stan Zimmerman	January 31, 1995	456755	15.0
12	"Love at First Flight"	Barnet Kellman	Jennifer Glickman & Seth Kurland	February 14, 1995	456764	13.9
13	"Bergman of Alcatraz"	Unknown	Jennifer Glickman	March 7, 1995	456767	11.4
14	"Hanging with Mr. Cooper"	Barnet Kellman	Barry Vigon & Tom Walla	March 14, 1995	456766	14.2
15	"Dr. Roof"	Unknown	Ruth Bennett	June 13, 1995	456765	10.0
16	"Dumping's Rotten in the State of Massachusetts"	N/A	Seth Kurland	Unaired	456753	N/A
17	"Mothers and Other Strangers"	N/A	James Berg & Stan Zimmerman	Unaired	456763	N/A
18	"Oy, the Jury"	N/A	James Berg & Stan Zimmerman	Unaired	456768	N/A

== Release ==
After the series premiered on October 1, 1994, on Saturdays at 8/7c, lackluster ratings prompted NBC to pull the show after only four episodes had aired. It was relaunched in December in a new Tuesday 8:30/7:30c slot. The series continued steadily for another three months, but it did not do much better in the ratings. NBC dropped the show from its lineup again in March 1995, and officially canceled it not long after. One more original episode turned up in the same Tuesday time slot on June 13, 1995, with three unaired episodes remaining.
