= Rita Rocks =

- Created by: James Berg & Stan Zimmerman
- Starring: Nicole Sullivan; Richard Ruccolo; Tisha Campbell-Martin; Ian Gomez; Natalie Dreyfuss; Kelly Gould; Raviv Ullman
- Composer: Matter Music
- Country of origin: United States
- Original language: English
- No. of seasons: 2
- No. of episodes: 40

Production
- Executive producers: James Berg & Stan Zimmerman
- Producer: Alan Padula
- Camera setup: Multi-camera
- Running time: 30 minutes
- Production companies: Zimmerman-Berg; Lifetime Television; Media Rights Capital

Original release
- Network: Lifetime
- Release: October 20, 2008 – December 7, 2009

Rita Rocks is a Lifetime original sitcom that ran from October 20, 2008 to December 7, 2009. It was the network's first original comedy in over a decade. The series debuted alongside re-runs of Reba as part of a new comedy hour for Tuesday nights, which later changed to Monday nights. The show stars Nicole Sullivan as Rita, Tisha Campbell-Martin, Richard Ruccolo, Raviv Ullman, and Kelly Gould.

On 11 January 2010, Lifetime cancelled the series after two seasons due to low ratings.

== Plot ==
A hard-working mom and wife splits her time between a job she doesn't particularly like, running the kids around and managing the household. She believes that if she can just get a few hours a week to herself, she can figure a few things out. After finding her old guitar in the garage and the prompting of a new friend, they start up a weekly jam session and are joined by a neighbor, the mail-woman and her daughter's boyfriend for nightly rehearsals. The plot is set in the Metropolitan Detroit area, most likely the Southfield area as Shannon attends Southfield Elementary School, which is shown throughout season 1.

In a February 2009 interview on Anytime with Bob Kushell, Sullivan agreed the main character is going through a midlife crisis, but she does not like using the term "midlife".

== Characters ==
=== Main ===
- Rita Clemens (Nicole Sullivan): a working mom with a busy life. She is the leader of a garage band and also the assistant manager of Bed Bath & Max. She was formerly training assistant before her boss learned of her pregnancy.
- Jay Clemens (Richard Ruccolo): Rita’s husband who tries his best to support her band. He sometimes takes care of the household, getting himself into funny situations in the process.
- Patty Mannix (Tisha Campbell-Martin): a postal worker and Rita's best friend who convinces her to take down her guitar and start the band.
- Hallie Clemens (Natalie Dreyfuss): Rita's absent-minded and rebellious teenage daughter.
- Shannon Clemens (Kelly Gould): Rita's nine-year-old daughter. She goes to a school for gifted children and is interested in space camp and astronauts.
- Kip (Raviv Ullman): Full name is Skip; Hallie's goofy and likable boyfriend/ex-boyfriend is the drummer in Rita's band. His parents are separated and he spends all of his time at the Clemens' household.
- Max: Rita & Jay's new baby. Rita gave birth to him in the Season 2 finale.
- Owen Delgado Jr. (Ian Gomez): Rita's unemployed neighbor who joins her garage band. He has two kids with wife Audrey. (left in 2009 to join Cougar Town).

=== Recurring ===
- Audrey (Lauren Bowles): Owen's wife and mother of his two children who seems to love her job more than her own husband.
- Chuck (Duane Martin): Rita's new neighbor, a former baseball player who is a huge annoyance to Rita and Jay. He and Patty (played by Duane Martin's wife Tisha Campbell-Martin) begin dating in late Season 2.
- Marilyn (Swoosie Kurtz): Rita's mother, who visits and stays for four episodes before leaving at Rita's request to talk to her father.
- Allison (Allie Gonino): Hallie's friend.
- Rusty (Paul Vato): the owner of the bowling alley where Rita's band performs publicly for the first time.

== Episodes ==
=== Series overview ===
Season	Episodes	Originally released	
Season	Episodes	First released	Last released
1	20	October 20, 2008	February 23, 2009
2	20	October 5, 2009	December 7, 2009

=== Season 1: 2008–09 ===
No. overall	No. in season	Title	Directed by	Written by	Original release date
1	1	"Pilot"	Andrew D. Weyman	James Berg & Stan Zimmerman	October 20, 2008
2	2	"Lies, Lies, Lies, Yeah-ah"	Shelley Jensen	Diane Burroughs & Joey Gutierrez	October 21, 2008
3	3	"You Gotta Have Friends"	Shelley Jensen	James Berg & Stan Zimmerman	October 22, 2008
4	4	"Flirting With Disaster"	Peter Marc Jacobson	Denise Moss	October 23, 2008
5	5	"Nobody Does It Better"	Katy Garretson	Bob Nickman	October 24, 2008
6	6	"Mother's Little Helper"	Peter Marc Jacobson	Sylvia Green	October 28, 2008
7	7	"Take This Job and Shove It"	Emile Levisetti	Nastaran Dibai & Jeffrey B. Hodes	November 11, 2008
8	8	"The Crying Game"	Andrew D. Weyman	Sylvia Green	November 18, 2008
9	9	"Under Pressure"	Katy Garretson	Diane Burroughs & Joey Gutierrez	November 25, 2008
10	10	"Got No Time"	Shelley Jensen	Denise Moss	December 2, 2008
11	11	"Love on the Rocks"	Shelley Jensen	Sylvia Green	December 9, 2008
12	12	"I Write The Songs"	Shelley Jensen	Diane Burroughs & Joey Gutierrez	December 16, 2008
13	13	"The Girl Is Mine"	Shelley Jensen	Bob Nickman	January 5, 2009
14	14	"Old Friends"	Shelley Jensen	Denise Moss	January 12, 2009
15	15	"It's My Party"	Emile Levisetti	Bob Nickman	January 19, 2009
16	16	"I Can't Make You Love Me"	Jody Margolin Hahn	Bill Fuller & Jim Pond	January 26, 2009
17	17	"Get Off of My Cloud"	Shelley Jensen	Teleplay by : Mark Driscoll; Story by : Adam Waring	February 2, 2009
18	18	"Killer Queen"	Shelley Jensen	Ellen Byron & Lissa Kapstrom	February 9, 2009
19	19	"What's Love Got Do To With It?"	Lynn McCracken	Diane Burroughs & Joey Gutierrez	February 16, 2009
20	20	"We Can Work It Out"	Gerry Cohen	James Berg & Stan Zimmerman	February 23, 2009

=== Season 2: 2009 ===
No. overall	No. in season	Title	Directed by	Written by	Original release date
21	1	"A Change is Gonna Come"	Shelley Jensen	Denise Moss	October 5, 2009
22	2	"Breaking Up is Hard to Do"	Shelley Jensen	Diane Burroughs & Joey Gutierrez	October 6, 2009
23	3	"Nothing's Gonna Change My World"	Shelley Jensen	Sylvia Green	October 7, 2009
24	4	"Welcome to the Working Week"	Andy Cadiff	Denise Moss	October 8, 2009
25	5	"Stuck in the Middle with You"	Andy Cadiff	Bob Nickman	October 9, 2009
26	6	"The Shape of Things To Come"	Lynn McCracken	Bob Nickman	October 13, 2009
27	7	"Mr. Bassman"	Andy Cadiff	Seth Kurland	October 20, 2009
28	8	"Mommy's Alright, Daddy's Alright"	Mark Cendrowski	Jennifer Glickman	October 26, 2009
29	9	"Vogue"	Lynn McCracken	Diane Burroughs & Joey Gutierrez	October 26, 2009
30	10	"Bad Company"	Shelley Jensen	Sylvia Green	November 2, 2009
31	11	"Why Can't We Be Friends?"	Shelley Jensen	Seth Kurland	November 2, 2009
32	12	"Mother and Child Reunion"	Shelley Jensen	Denise Moss	November 9, 2009
33	13	"Anchors Aweigh"	Leonard R. Garner Jr.	Diane Burroughs & Joey Gutierrez	November 9, 2009
34	14	"Shower The People"	Shelley Jensen	Jennifer Glickman	November 16, 2009
35	15	"Is She Really Going Out With Him?"	Shelley Jensen	Matt Quezada & Frank Wolff	November 16, 2009
36	16	"Sympathy For The Devil"	Leonard R. Garner Jr.	Bob Nickman	November 23, 2009
37	17	"Jingle All The Way"	Shelley Jensen	Teleplay by : Seth Kurland; Story by : Maxine Lapiduss & Seth Kurland	November 23, 2009
38	18	"The Jealous Kind"	Shelley Jensen	Sylvia Green	November 30, 2009
39	19	"Should I Stay or Should I Go?"	Shelley Jensen	Denise Moss	November 30, 2009
40	20	"Born In The USA"	Shelley Jensen	Bob Nickman	December 7, 2009

== Home media ==
Rita Rocks: The Complete 1st Season was released on a 3-disc combo pack on April 27, 2010.

== International broadcasting ==
- Arena TV in Australia airs the program.
- Citytv in Canada airs the program.
- STAR World in Asia airs the program.
- Fox Life in Poland, Turkey, Greece, Portugal, Bulgaria, Bosnia and Herzegovina, Croatia and Serbia airs the program.
- SKY Uno in Italy is going to air in autumn 2009.
- NET 5 in the Netherlands airs the program
- TNT Serie in Germany airs the program.
- Comédie! in France, Belgium and Switzerland will air the sitcom in 2010.
- Yes Comedy in Israel airs the program.
- TV4 Komedi in Sweden airs the program.
- MTV3 in Finland airs the program.
