= Beatrice De Alba =

Oscar and BAFTA Winning Film Hair Stylist and Make-up Artist

- Born: Beatrice Marie De Alba; 10 August 1964; Los Angeles, California, United States
- Education: Ramona Convent Secondary School
- Occupations: Hair stylist and makeup artist
- Years active: 1986–present
- Notable work: Frida; The Twilight Saga: Breaking Dawn; Magic City
- Spouses: Richard Elizondo (m. 1982; div. 1986); Robert Spears (m. 2013)
- Children: Richard De Alba

Beatrice Marie De Alba (/deɪ ˈælbə/ day AL-bə, Spanish: [de ˈalβa]; August 10, 1964) is an Academy Award winning hair stylist and make-up artist.

== Biography ==
Beatrice De Alba was born in Los Angeles, California. She began her career as a make-up artist in Hollywood working in both film and television. She soon gravitated toward wigs and period hair design. As the Hair Department Head on the film Frida (2002), she won an Academy Award and a BAFTA Award. She has also been nominated for a Primetime Emmy Award for the made-for-television film Liz & Dick (2012).

She was the series' department head hairstylist for the 2012-2013 Starz show Magic City.

In 2016, she was invited to join the Academy of Motion Picture Arts and Sciences.

She created Matthew McConaughey's long-haired blond wig for the 2019 movie The Beach Bum.

== Selected filmography ==
- Californication (2014)
- The Twilight Saga: Breaking Dawn – Part 2 (2012)
- The Twilight Saga: Breaking Dawn – Part 1 (2011)
- The Curious Case of Benjamin Button (2008)
- National Treasure (2004)
- Frida (2002)
- The Mummy Returns (2001)
- Blast from the Past (1999)
- Jingle All the Way (1996)
- Wild Hearts Can't Be Broken (1991)
