= James Berg =

American television producer and writer

- Occupations: Television producer Screenwriter
- Known for: Gilmore Girls
- Notable work: Rita Rocks

James Berg is an American television producer and writer. He has written for many television series including The Golden Girls, Roseanne and Gilmore Girls and the 1996 feature film A Very Brady Sequel. He has frequently collaborated with fellow producer and writer Stan Zimmerman. Berg and Zimmerman were also the creators and executive producers of the sitcom, Rita Rocks, starring Nicole Sullivan and Tisha Campbell-Martin which ran on Lifetime Television.

Berg and Zimmerman received two WGA nominations - one for The Golden Girls, "Rose's Mother" and one for the lesbian kiss episode of Roseanne, "Don't Ask, Don't Tell".

His other television writing credits include Brothers, Just Our Luck, George Burns Comedy Week, Hooperman, Something Wilder, Fame, and Wanda at Large.

Berg cowrote the play Silver Foxes (originally conceived as a television series). The play is based on the documentary Gen Silent, about LGBT seniors forced to live in the closet to handle bureaucratic discrimination. Described as a "gay male Golden Girls," it has played in theaters across the US. It is co-written with Zimmerman, who also previously worked together as writers on Rita Rocks, Golden Girls, and Gilmore Girls.

In 2023, Berg and Zimmerman co-wrote the Lifetime original movie, Ladies of the '80s: A Divas Christmas, starring Loni Anderson, Morgan Fairchild, Linda Gray, Donna Mills, and Nicollette Sheridan.

== Personal life ==
He is openly gay.
