= The Other Lover =

- Genre: Drama
- Written by: Judith Parker; Susan Title
- Story by: Deborah Amelon (as Deborah Amelon-Huddy); Robert Kosberg; Larry A. Thompson
- Directed by: Robert Ellis Miller
- Creative directors: Ross Bellah; William L. Campbell
- Starring: Lindsay Wagner; Jack Scalia
- Composer: Lee Holdridge
- Country of origin: United States
- Original language: English

Production
- Executive producer: Larry A. Thompson
- Producers: Hugh Benson; Robert Kosberg
- Cinematography: Fred Koenekamp (as Fred J. Koenekamp)
- Editor: J. Terry Williams
- Running time: 100 minutes
- Production companies: Larry A. Thompson Productions; Columbia Pictures Television

Original release
- Network: CBS
- Release: September 24, 1985

The Other Lover is a 1985 American made-for-television drama film directed by Robert Ellis Miller and executive produced by Larry A. Thompson.

== Plot ==
The story begins with Jack Hollander in his apartment at a typewriter, remembering the events that are relayed through the rest of the film.

Jack is a novelist, infuriated with his publisher, Dunham Publications, for putting a soft-porn cover on his latest novel. He confronts marketing director Claire Fielding and demands to know what the cover has to do with the book itself. She admits she didn't read the book before deciding what cover should be used, but assures him it will only help with sales.

Claire books him on a talk show hosted by Michael Jackson where Jack says he can't defend the cover and that the publisher has no excuse for it either. Claire and Jack have a brief fight in the hotel hallway, with Claire ending it by entering her room and closing the door. Jack goes to his own room, and after 1 AM goes back to knock on her door to apologize. He demands she let him apologize to her face and she opens the door to him, at which point he says he's sorry before demanding an apology from her. When she tells him to leave the room, Jack doesn't, stalking toward her before kissing her.

When Claire returns home, she decides not to tell her husband, Peter, about Jack. When Claire sees Jack again, she tells him she has a late meeting the next day and will call him after.

Jack's friend, Sal, tries to get Jack to come over and visit his former lover, Lisa. Claire arrives and sees them, then leaves. She returns to confront Jack. The next evening, Claire is in a restaurant with Peter. After they almost fight over making a decision, Peter's pager beeps. Claire returns to Jack. Shortly after, she reveals the affair to her friend Kate. When she goes to see Jack next, Claire tells Jack their next show in Los Angeles has been cancelled. He tells Claire he's in love with her.

Lisa and Jack go to Abbott Galleries together, and Claire and Peter show up. Claire tries to avoid Jack, but he approaches her and gets an introduction to Peter. The next morning, Claire invites Jack to go to Toronto with her and tells him she loves him.

Kate cautions Claire against continuing the affair.

Peter surprises Claire by telling her he was able to rearrange his work schedule to go to Toronto with her. When Peter goes to pack, Claire immediately calls Jack. When he doesn't pick up, she calls Kate to go tell Jack about Peter. Kate drives to the airport and finds Jack in line at the ticket counter. Jack goes home and gets drunk. Sal is there, and suggests Jack end the affair.

Days later, Jack drives to Claire's house. He parks outside and sits in his car until he sees Claire's bedroom light turn on. The next day, Jack goes to Claire's office and badgers Claire's secretary, Danny, until he tells Jack that Claire is at Tiffany's. When Jack arrives at the store to confront her, she immediately hands him the bag, telling him it's a present for him. They get on a streetcar, and have an awkward conversation during which Jack declares that he and Claire shouldn't see each other for a while.

Danny mentions Claire and Peter's annual Christmas Eve party to Jack, which Jack shows up to very late. Claire enters the kitchen and Jack accosts her. She leads him outside, where Alison finds them kissing. Claire breaks the kiss to see her daughter standing there and calls her name, but Alison runs, away from the house. Claire chases after her. When Alison stops, Claire tries to talk to Alison, but Alison is angry.

Claire meets Jack on another day to tell him Alison has agreed not to tell Peter. When Jack asks if Claire will tell Peter, she admits that she can't. Jack then says goodbye to Claire. The story then returns to the present, with Jack sitting in his apartment typing, where he laments he can't find an ending to his new novel. Jack next appears leaving a Chinese restaurant. He sees Claire at a street florist. They approach each other and have a stilted conversation. They part ways after agreeing to meet the next day; she looks back, but he doesn't.

The next day, he calls the restaurant they agreed to meet at and is told that she had already called to cancel. He then says he has an ending for the book, which is on sale in the final scene, titled The Other Lover.

== Cast ==
- Lindsay Wagner as Claire Fielding
- Jack Scalia as Jack Hollander
- Max Gail as Sal
- Millie Perkins as Kate
- John Bennett Perry as Peter Fielding
- Shannen Doherty as Alison Fielding
- Jaime Lyn Hart as Maggie Fielding
- Stephanie Winslow as Diane
- John Short as the tour guide
- Lisle Wilson
- Gary Alan Wong
- Joseph Knowland as gentleman at party
- Horace Johnson as waiter
- David Wiley as inkeeper
- Michael Jackson as Himself
- Jonathan Perpich as Danny
- Alex Donnelley as Lisa Gordon
- Sands Hall as Jenny

== Production ==
Production began in January 1985. It was produced by Larry A. Thompson for CBS and directed by Robert Ellis Miller. Fred Koenekamp handled cinematography and Lee Holdridge composed the film's music.

Filming took place in both Chinatown, Los Angeles and in San Francisco. The San Francisco filming occurred in February 1985.

== Release ==
The movie debuted on CBS on the evening of Tuesday, September 24, 1985. It was the first of the "CBS Tuesday Movie" series, which had been designed to draw female viewership. Other films in the series included Murder By Reason of Insanity, Love, Mary and Promises to Keep.

== Critical reception ==
John J. O'Connor of The New York Times was unimpressed. He called the characters "dreary" and commented on how Claire's actions contradict her words, indicating that her wardrobe changes were excessive and unnecessary. He also stated that the only noteworthy moment in the film was the realism of Claire telling Jack that they both want his book to sell, regardless of whether he likes the cover.

The review in Variety was far more positive, with the reviewer praising the acting and direction, as well as the story's theme of "losing perspectives" before eventually regaining "good sense." The reviewer also found the pacing to be well done with the story moving through a range of emotions, though they commented that these are sometimes "stretched thin." Scalia's performance impressed them by adding a vulnerability to the "aggressive" Hollander. They also favored the performances of Gail, Perkins, and Perry, while also stating that Wagner's performance was of her typical caliber. The reviewer noted that Koenekamp's cinematography "lends its own spirit" to Fielding's affair with Hollander.

Joan Hanauer, in a syndicated column printed in The Union Democrat, didn't stop with saying the characters were dreary like O'Connor did; she stated the whole story fit that description, though it also had "steamy" scenes. She described Hollander acting in the jealous manner typically assigned to the woman who waits on her married lover, and called both Hollander and Fielding "totally selfish people," lamenting that their affair is the sum total of the film. Hanauer did like the cinematography of San Francisco while noting that she found it difficult to have any sympathy for the characters.

Rick Sherwood of The New York Times, reprinted in The Gainesville Sun, expressed disappointment that the film relied only on a surface exploration of the role-reversal. Ellen Levy of the Bangor Daily News called it a "sociological soap," pointing out the film's commentary on women being in the U.S. workforce in greater numbers. Judy Flander, in a review printed in The Ledger, gave a scathing commentary on what she referred to as "women's pictures." Specific to The Other Lover, Flander described it as "mediocre."

A brief review from Faye Zuckerman via the New York Times News Service in 1987 described the film as "contrived" and "predictable" with "mundane dialogue."

== Audience reception ==
The Nielsen ratings for the 1985–1986 season placed The Other Lover at number 30 out of 50 CBS films. It had a rating share of 13.8/22. It was ranked at number 165, tied with NBC's Mirrors, for the 1985–1986 made-for-tv movie season.

== Sources ==
- "CBS-TV Rolls Out PlansFor Vidpics, Budgeting $12-Mil". Variety. Vol. 317, no. 10. January 2, 1985. p. 98.
- "Col Pix TV Tempts Auds With Far-Flung Locations". Variety. Vol. 208, no. 30. July 18, 1985. p. 10.
- "Made-For-TV Movie Ratings For 1985-86 (Sept. 1, 1985 Through Aug. 31, 1986)". Variety. Vol. 324, no. 9. September 24, 1986. pp. 74–76.
- "Nielsen Telefilm Ratings". Variety. Vol. 213, no. 45. November 7, 1986. pp. 94, 96.
- Archerd, Army (February 8, 1985). "Just for Variety". Variety. Vol. 206, no. 45. p. 3.
- Flander, Judy (September 24, 1985). "Another 'woman's film' snares Lindsay Wagner". The Ledger. Vol. 79, no. 337. p. 6D.
- Hanauer, Joan (August 23, 1985). "Special Events Top Beginning Week Of TV's Autumn Season". Durant Democrat. Vol. 85, no. 298. p. 2.
- Hanauer, Joan (September 24, 1985). "CBS movies search for women viewers". The Union Democrat. Vol. 132, no. 60. p. 7.
- Kirby, Kip (April 27, 1985). "Nashville Scene". Billboard. Vol. 97, no. 17. p. 48 – via Google Books.
- Levy, Ellen (September 20, 1985). "TV Previews". TV Update. Bangor Daily News. Vol. 97, no. 96. p. 26.
- O'Connor, John J. (September 24, 1985). "TV Reviews; 'Other Lover' on CBS". The New York Times. Archived from the original on November 8, 2012.
- Sherwood, Rick (September 24, 1985). "'Growing Pains' is more of the latter". The Gainesville Sun. Vol. 110, no. 82. p. 4C – via New York Times News Service.
- Tone (September 24, 1985). "The CBS Tuesday Night Movie: The Other Lover". Variety. Vol. 209, no. 13. pp. 10, 12.
- Tusher, Will (March 6, 1985). "Chinatown Makes Filming Easy: Do It Our Way". Variety. Vol. 207, no. 1. pp. 3, 26.
- Wilson, John (February 8, 1985). "Tube Talk". TV Times. Regina Leader-Post. p. 21.
- Zuckerman, Faye (April 28, 1987). "Show offers some easy reading". The Tuscaloosa News. Vol. 169, no. 118. p. 10 – via New York Times News Service.
