= George Burns Comedy Week =

- Presented by: George Burns
- Country of origin: United States
- No. of seasons: 1
- No. of episodes: 13

Production
- Executive producers: Carl Gottlieb; Steve Martin
- Running time: 30 min.
- Production companies: 40 Share Productions; Universal Television

Original release
- Network: CBS
- Release: September 18 – December 25, 1985

George Burns Comedy Week is a comedy anthology television series broadcast in the United States by CBS as part of its 1985 fall lineup, hosted by George Burns.

== Overview ==
As he was age 89 when the show premiered, George Burns was billed as the oldest person ever to "star" in a television series. Burns had been around television in one way or another since shortly after its inception; like many old-time radio stars he had brought his routine over more-or-less intact from the older medium. However, his actual role in this series was rather slight; aside from lending his name, introducing the night's program, and providing an occasional voice-over narration, Burns was not involved in any of the episodes as an actor and those who tuned in expecting to see him as such were disappointed.

Several well-known comedians appeared in episodes of this show, including Joe Piscopo, Robert Klein, Don Rickles, Martin Mull, Don Knotts, and Howard Hesseman. The show is probably best known for two particular segments, one being "Christmas Carol II: The Sequel" in which an adult Tiny Tim has come to exhibit many of the characteristics once defining his father's old boss, Ebenezer Scrooge, and another starring Valerie Perrine and Harvey Korman in what proved to be the pilot for their sitcom, Leo & Liz in Beverly Hills.

== Episodes ==
No.	Title	Directed by	Written by	Original release date
1	"The Dynamite Girl"	Peter Bonerz	Story by : Steve Martin & Carl Gottlieb; Teleplay by : Carl Gottlieb	September 18, 1985
2	"Home for Dinner"	Carl Gottlieb	Larry Levin & Jonathan Day	September 25, 1985
3	"Death Benefits"	Neal Israel	Amy Heckerling & Neal Israel	October 2, 1985
4	"The Smiths"	Phil Alden Robinson	James Berg & Stan Zimmerman	October 9, 1985
5	"The Couch"	Steve Martin	Story by : Steve Martin & Carl Gottlieb; Teleplay by : Ed Scharlach	October 16, 1985
6	"Disaster at Buzz Creek"	John Landis	Andy Breckman	October 23, 1985
7	"The Assignment"	Phil Alden Robinson	Bruce Jay Friedman (based on his story "The Mission")	October 30, 1985
8	"Dream, Dream, Dream"	John G. Fox	David Simon	November 6, 1985
9	"Boris and Ivan Visit Las Vegas"	Carl Gottlieb	Story by : Carl Gottlieb; Teleplay by : Paul Perlove	November 13, 1985
10	"The Honeybunnies"	Peter Bonerz	David Cohen & Roger S.H. Schulman	November 27, 1985
11	"The Funniest Guy in the World"	John Korty	Pamela Pettler	December 4, 1985
12	"Christmas Carol II: The Sequel"	Carl Gottlieb	Carl Gottlieb & David Axlerod	December 11, 1985
13	"The Borrowing"	Alan Myerson	Story by : Merrill Markoe; Teleplay by : Pamela Pettler	December 25, 1985

== Reception ==
George Burns Comedy Week did poorly in the Nielsen ratings and was last broadcast on Christmas night 1985. It marked Burns' last ongoing role in a television series, although he continued to appear as a guest on programs for the next nine years, until suffering a serious fall at age 98 which ended his active performing career (Burns died at age 100).

== Ratings ==
Note: The "Rating" is not the 18-49 demo but the total rating.

Viewership and ratings per episode of George Burns Comedy Week
No.	Title	Air date	Timeslot (ET)	Rating (18–49)	Viewers (millions)
1	"The Dynamite Girl"	September 18, 1985	Wednesday 9:30 p.m.	14.5 (#31 of 58)	12.4
2	"Home for Dinner"	September 25, 1985	Wednesday 9:30 p.m.	10.8 (#55 of 64)	9.2
3	"Death Benefits"	October 2, 1985	Wednesday 9:30 p.m.	11.9 (#56 of 69)	10.2
4	"The Smiths"	October 9, 1985	Wednesday 9:30 p.m.	12.6 (#53 of 63)	10.8
5	"The Couch"	October 16, 1985	Wednesday 9:30 p.m.	12.1 (#57 of 67)	10.4
6	"Disaster at Buzz Creek"	October 23, 1985	Wednesday 9:30 p.m.	11.1 (#61 of 66)	9.5
7	"The Assignment"	October 30, 1985	Wednesday 9:30 p.m.	10.7 (#63 of 67)	9.2
8	"Dream, Dream, Dream"	November 6, 1985	Wednesday 9:30 p.m.	11.8 (#60 of 67)	10.1
9	"Boris and Ivan Visit Las Vegas"	November 13, 1985	Wednesday 9:30 p.m.	11.1 (#60 of 68)	9.5
10	"The Honeybunnies"	November 27, 1985	Wednesday 9:30 p.m.	9.2 (#64 of 68)	7.9
11	"The Funniest Guy in the World"	December 04, 1985	Wednesday 9:30 p.m.	9.0 (#69 of 72)	7.7
12	"Christmas Carol II: The Sequel"	December 11, 1985	Wednesday 9:30 p.m.	10.3 (#66 of 71)	8.8
13	"The Borrowing"	December 25, 1985	Wednesday 9:30 p.m.	9.8 (#62 of 67)	8.4

Source: A.C. Nielsen Company via Los Angeles Times
