= A Very Brady Sequel =

1996 film by Arlene Sanford

- Theatrical release poster
- Directed by: Arlene Sanford
- Screenplay by: Harry Elfont; Deborah Kaplan; James Berg; Stan Zimmerman
- Story by: Harry Elfont; Deborah Kaplan
- Based on: The Brady Bunch by Sherwood Schwartz
- Produced by: Sherwood Schwartz; Lloyd J. Schwartz; Alan Ladd, Jr.
- Starring: Shelley Long; Gary Cole; Tim Matheson
- Cinematography: Mac Ahlberg
- Edited by: Anita Brandt-Burgoyne
- Music by: Guy Moon
- Production companies: The Ladd Company; Sherwood Schwartz Productions
- Distributed by: Paramount Pictures
- Release date: August 23, 1996
- Running time: 89 minutes
- Country: United States
- Language: English
- Budget: $15 million
- Box office: $21.4 million

A Very Brady Sequel is a 1996 American comedy film loosely based on the television series The Brady Bunch, created by Sherwood Schwartz. It was directed by Arlene Sanford (in her feature film directorial debut), with a screenplay by Harry Elfont, Deborah Kaplan, James Berg and Stan Zimmerman, and starring Shelley Long, Gary Cole and Tim Matheson. It also features cameos from RuPaul, Zsa Zsa Gabor, Rosie O'Donnell, Barbara Eden, David Spade, and Richard Belzer.

The film was quickly produced after the success of the first film, The Brady Bunch Movie. The Bradys, after successfully saving their home, deal with a new wave of problems. A valuable antique horse statue Carol owns is being sought after by a man named Roy, lying that he is Carol's first husband with Roy befriending and living with the Bradys to steal the horse. The film essentially follows its predecessor, by placing the 1970s Brady Bunch family in a contemporary 1990s setting, where much of the humor is derived from the resulting culture clash and the utter lack of awareness they show toward their relatively unusual lifestyle.

A Very Brady Sequel was released by Paramount Pictures on August 23, 1996. The film received mixed reviews and earned less than half of what The Brady Bunch Movie did at the box office. A second sequel, the made-for-television feature The Brady Bunch in the White House, aired in November 2002.

== Plot ==
One evening, a man claiming to be Carol's long-lost first husband Roy Martin, shows up at the 1970s-trapped suburban Brady residence. This causes Carol to faint. The Bradys believe his story about suffering from amnesia and having plastic surgery after being injured. Mike has been planning a surprise second wedding/renewal of vows for himself and Carol for their anniversary present, and Roy's arrival throws the Bradys into chaos. Throughout Roy's stay he is openly hostile to the Bradys, albeit with his sarcasm and insults completely going over their heads.

Peter, who is trying to decide on a career path, begins to idolize and emulate Roy which gets him into trouble at the architecture firm where Mike works. Peter later mentions Roy talking about "the big house" and Mike, who learns that it means prison, starts becoming suspicious.

Greg and Marcia both want to move out of their shared rooms and when neither wants to back down, they have to share the attic together. When Roy's arrival suggests that Carol and Mike might not be married, Greg and Marcia wonder whether they are not technically related. This leads them to separately realize they are in love with each other, which they try to hide from one another.

Bobby and Cindy start a "Detective Agency" to hunt down her missing doll. Upon finding it, they stumble upon a photograph revealing the truth about Roy: he is actually a conman named Trevor Thomas, the assistant to the real Roy, there to steal a familiar horse statue that is actually an ancient artifact worth $20 million.

The kids reveal Trevor's plans to Carol and confront Trevor who, realizing his cover is blown, kidnaps Carol, taking her with him to Hawaii, where he plans to sell the artifact to a buyer named Dr. Whitehead, and ties Alice and the kids up to keep them from intervening. Mike, who's now fully aware of Trevor's deception, alerts the police, frees Alice and the children, and the family flies to Hawaii to save Carol and foil Trevor's plans.

In Hawaii, Carol manages to escape from Trevor and finds her way to Dr. Whitehead's estate before Trevor gets there. It turns out Trevor was responsible for the boating accident that led to the disappearance of Dr. Whitehead's son Gilligan and Carol's first husband, a professor. In Dr. Whitehead's words, "The Minnow is lost", and he refuses to pay Trevor for the horse. Trevor attempts to hold Dr. Whitehead and Carol at gunpoint for payment, but Mike and the family arrive just in time to intervene and, after a brief scuffle between the two men, Mike quickly gains the upper hand, and subdues Trevor, who is subsequently arrested.

Dr. Whitehead offers to pay the Bradys the $20 million for the horse but Mike declines the offer, claiming it's a symbol of their togetherness. Cindy gives him her doll to console him—after almost losing her mother, she has outgrown it. Jan, who made up a pretend boyfriend named George Glass in order to make herself seem more popular, meets a real boy named George Glass during the family's trip to Hawaii, and they become a couple.

As Mike and Carol renew their vows in a ceremony held at their home, Marcia agrees to let Greg have the attic to himself until he goes to college, and the two share one last on-screen kiss before returning to being brother and sister. The movie ends with Carol tossing the bouquet, and a genie named Jeannie arriving just in time to catch it. She then claims to be Mike Brady's first wife, much to Mike and Carol's dismay. This causes Carol to faint once again.

== Cast ==
- Gary Cole as Mike Brady
- Shelley Long as Carol Brady
- Christopher Daniel Barnes as Greg Brady
- Christine Taylor as Marcia Brady
- Paul Sutera as Peter Brady
- Jennifer Elise Cox as Jan Brady
- Jesse Lee as Bobby Brady
- Olivia Hack as Cindy Brady
- Henriette Mantel as Alice Nelson
- Tim Matheson as Roy Martin/Trevor Thomas
- Brian Van Holt as Warren Mulaney
- John Hillerman as Dr. Whitehead
- Connie Ray as Flight Attendant

The film featured cameo appearances from RuPaul (reprising his role as Mrs. Cummings, Jan's guidance counselor from the first film), Zsa Zsa Gabor (in her last screen role), and Rosie O'Donnell (as members of Carol's Women's club), Barbara Eden (reprising her role as Jeannie from I Dream of Jeannie), David Spade (as Carol's hairstylist), and Richard Belzer (reprising his role as John Munch, the police detective whom Mike asks to investigate Roy/Trevor). Whip Hubley portrays Explorer/Dead Husband (the real Roy, the Professor, from Gilligan's Island) in the opening scene.

== Production ==
In May 1995, Sherwood Schwartz announced a sequel to The Brady Bunch Movie was in development. Bonnie and Terry Turner were unable to return to write the sequel due to commitments at The Carsey-Werner Company Director Betty Thomas was also unable to return as she was committed to The Late Shift and Arlene Sanford taking the role.

== Release ==
=== Box office ===
A Very Brady Sequel was released in theaters on August 23, 1996. The film grossed $7.1 million on its opening weekend, debuting on 2,147 screens. While some critics preferred this sequel to its predecessor the film performed half as well at the box office, whereas its predecessor grossed $46 million domestically. Gross sales are estimated at $21.4 million.

=== Home media ===
A Very Brady Sequel was released by Paramount Home Video on VHS on February 11, 1997. It was released on DVD on June 10, 2003, and on April 25, 2017. The film has also been released digitally on Google Play.

== Reception ==
The film received mixed reviews from film critics. On the review aggregator website Rotten Tomatoes, 58% of 36 critics' reviews are positive, with an average rating of 5.9/10. Metacritic, which uses a weighted average, assigned the film a score of 56 out of 100, based on 21 critics, indicating "mixed or average" reviews. Audiences surveyed by CinemaScore gave the film an average grade of "B−" on a scale of A+ to F.

Roger Ebert judged that while it was not an outstanding film, it was noticeably better than its predecessor. He elaborated that it addressed his chief criticism of the original by showing more of the contemporary world the Bradys live in and finding humor in the contrast between their innocence and the dangers of the world around them. He gave it two and a half stars. Gene Siskel said that the movie was "surprisingly funny", with a "clever" plot and a "solid cast". He agreed that it was better than the original and awarded it three stars. Janet Maslin of The New York Times described the movie as an "archly nostalgic trifle" that was "Brady with a vengeance". She praised its wit, casting and costume design, and noted that it had "slightly more plot" than the original.

Mick LaSalle of the San Francisco Chronicle instead found the film not as fresh as the original, opining that while the subplots with the Brady children are bold and funny, the main plot failed to exploit its comedic possibilities. He still found it overall enjoyable enough to satisfy those who liked the first film, and commented that "As a satire of a sitcom that wasn't funny, it's often at its funniest when it's purposely stale."

=== Legacy ===
Beginning in the mid-2010s, the moment where Marcia Brady (portrayed by Christine Taylor) says "Sure, Jan" became an internet meme, usually in the form of a response gif. In the original scene, while the Brady family is at the dinner table, Marcia questions Jan about her "boyfriend" George Glass. In 2021, writer James Berg responded to the meme during an interview with Vice. Berg cited Taylor's delivery of the line as a key factor for its success. Meanwhile, Taylor quipped that the meme was "genius".
