= Rod McCary =

American commercial, film and television actor

- Born: April 15, 1941 (age 85); St. Cloud, Minnesota, U.S.
- Education: University of Denver
- Occupations: Commercial, film and television actor
- Years active: 1970–present
- Spouse: Emily
- Children: 1

Rod McCary (born April 15, 1941) is an American commercial, film and television actor.

McCary was born in St. Cloud, Minnesota, and attended Cathedral High School. While sidelined from football with a broken collar-bone he decided to appear in a school production of Finian's Rainbow. After spending a year at the University of Denver he transferred to UCLA where he obtained a degree. He then worked as an elementary school teacher and started taking acting jobs.

McCary starred in the television programs Harper Valley P.T.A., playing the role of "Bobby Taylor", Just Our Luck, playing the role of "Nelson Marriott" and Shell Game, playing the role of "Bill Bower".

McCary also guest-starred in numerous television programs including Three's Company, It's a Living, Highway to Heaven, Columbo, Fantasy Island, Murder, She Wrote, Mama's Family, Dear John, Parks and Recreation, Family Ties, Growing Pains, The Mod Squad, Alice and Hart to Hart. He also starred and co-starred in films such as Herbie Rides Again, Night of the Demons 2, Dallas Cowboys Cheerleaders II, Stewardess School, Down 'n Dirty, Terror Among Us, Cheaper to Keep Her and 976-Evil II. In 1975, McCary left the soap opera television series General Hospital, with four other actors.

McCary is married to Emily, with whom he has a son Cooper.
