= Elizabeth Taylor Diamond =

33.19-carat (6.638 g) diamond

The Elizabeth Taylor Diamond, formerly known as the Krupp Diamond, is a 33.19-carat (6.638 g) diamond that was bought by Richard Burton for his wife, Elizabeth Taylor, in 1968. The diamond was one of a number of significant pieces of jewellery owned by Taylor; her collection also included the 68 carat Taylor–Burton Diamond, which was bought by the couple in 1969. The diamond was sold by Taylor's estate in 2011 for $8.8 million.

== Description ==
The Elizabeth Taylor Diamond is an Asscher cut diamond with a fairly large culet facet, indicating it was likely cut before the 1920s, as culet facets were being phased out. A report (1132411262) dated 9 May 2011 from the Gemological Institute of America states that the diamond is D colour, VS1 clarity. A supplemental letter states, among other details, that the diamond has been determined to be a Type IIa diamond.

== History ==
The diamond was originally named after the Krupp family of German industrialists, and it was sold as part of the estate of Vera Krupp (1909–1967), second wife of Alfried Krupp.

The diamond was stolen on April 10, 1959. As Vera Krupp and her foreman were finishing dinner, three men knocked on her door. In seconds they forced their way in, took the Krupp Diamond, then as a ring, off her finger roughly, drawing blood. The robbers proceeded to tie Krupp and her foreman blindfolded back-to-back with wire from a lamp. The robbers then went through the house, stealing about $700,000 in cash, a revolver, and a camera. Krupp and the foreman got free, but the battery powered ranch phone was dead, so they had to drive to the Las Vegas airport to call police. The FBI got involved, because they assumed that the stolen diamond would soon be transported across state lines. This theory would turn out correct.

Burton bought the Krupp diamond on May 17, 1968, at an auction in New York for $307,000, and presented Taylor with the diamond on their yacht, the Kalizma while it was moored on the River Thames in London.

Elizabeth Taylor wore the Krupp Diamond as a ring, and called it her favorite piece. The Krupp Diamond and other famous pieces of jewellery in Taylor's collection became part of Taylor's image. After Taylor's death, the stone was renamed "The Elizabeth Taylor Diamond".

Taylor often wore her own jewellery including the Krupp Diamond in films, television movies, and personal appearances when she considered it appropriate.

Taylor died in 2011 and the diamond was auctioned at Christie's by her estate on 13 December 2011, having been renamed the Elizabeth Taylor Diamond. It was sold for $8,818,500 (including buyer's premium, equivalent to $12.6 million as of 2025), to the South Korean conglomerate E-Land, setting a record price per carat US$265,697 for a colorless diamond.

== See also ==
- Taylor–Burton Diamond, bought by Taylor and Burton in 1969
- List of diamonds
- List of most valuable celebrity memorabilia

== Sources ==
- Balfour, Ian (2009). Famous Diamonds. London: Antique Collectors Club. ISBN 978-1-85-149479-8.
- Burton, Richard (2012). The Richard Burton Diaries. New York: Yale University Press. ISBN 978-0-300-18010-7.
- Kashner, Sam; Schoenberger, Nancy (2010). Furious Love. London: JR Books. ISBN 978-1-90753-222-1.
- Kelley, Kitty (1981). Elizabeth Taylor, the Last Star. Simon and Schuster. p. 228. ISBN 978-0-671-25543-5.
