= Taylor–Burton Diamond =

Diamond weighing 68 carats (13.6 g)

Taylor–Burton
- Weight: 68 carats (13.6 g)
- Cut: Pear
- Country of origin: South Africa
- Mine of origin: Premier Diamond Mine
- Discovered: 1966
- Cut by: Harry Winston
- Original owner: Harriet Annenberg Ames (1967–1969); Elizabeth Taylor and Richard Burton (1969–1975); Elizabeth Taylor (1975–1979); Harry Lambert (1979)
- Owner: Robert Mouawad (1979–present)

The Taylor–Burton Diamond, a diamond weighing 68 carats (13.6 g), became famous in 1969 when it was purchased by actors Richard Burton and Elizabeth Taylor. Burton had previously been the underbidder when jeweller Cartier bought the diamond at auction for $1,050,000, setting a record price for a publicly sold jewel. Thousands of people in New York and Chicago queued to see the diamond after its 1969 sale. It was subsequently worn by Taylor at Princess Grace of Monaco's 40th birthday, and at the 42nd Academy Awards.

== Description ==
The original rough diamond was found in 1966 in the Premier Mine in South Africa, weighing 241 carats (48.2 g). Harry Winston cut it into the shape of a pear weighing 69.42 carats (13.884 g).

At the time of sale in 1969, the diamond was set in a platinum ring with two smaller diamonds on either side. After its purchase by Taylor and Burton, Taylor found the diamond too heavy to wear as a ring, and commissioned an $80,000 diamond necklace which included a custom setting for the diamond. The necklace was designed to fit Taylor's neck allowing the diamond to cover her tracheotomy scar resulting from her bout with near fatal pneumonia in 1961. In 1980, Robert Mouawad, subsequent owner of the Taylor Burton diamond, had it recut to 68.0 carats (13.60 g).

== History ==
The diamond was originally bought by Harriet Annenberg Ames, the sister of the billionaire publisher Walter Annenberg, in 1967. Annenberg Ames feared wearing the diamond in her native New York City, and decided to sell the stone. She later said that "I found myself positively cringing and keeping my gloves on for fear it would be seen. ... It sat in a bank vault for years. It seemed foolish to keep it if one could not use it. As things are in New York one could not possibly wear it publicly".

=== 1969 sale ===
It was announced that the auction would take place on 23 October 1969, with the diamond listed as lot 133, at Parke-Bernet in New York City. The diamond was flown to Gstaad in Switzerland so that the actress Elizabeth Taylor could see it, and flown back to the United States for the auction. Taylor's husband, the actor Richard Burton, had set a maximum bid of $1 million for the diamond, with his lawyer, Aaron Frosch, bidding on the telephone from London, and Al Yugler of the jewellers Frank Pollock and Sons, bidding in the room for Burton.

The auction began at $200,000 with everyone in the room shouting "Yes!" when the amount was announced, but by $500,000 only nine people remained in the auction. The sale proceeded in increments of $10,000 after $500,000, and only two people remained at $650,000. At $1 million, Yugler, who was bidding for Taylor and Burton, dropped out of the auction, which ended shortly after. It was unsure in the crowded room as to who the winner was, but it was later revealed to be Robert Kenmore, from the Kenmore Corporation, the parent company of the jewellers Cartier.

Underbidders in the sale included the jeweller Harry Winston, the Sultan of Brunei Hassanal Bolkiah, and the Greek shipping magnate Aristotle Onassis, who had dropped out of the auction at $700,000. The final price was $1,050,000, which was a new record for a public auction of a jewel. The previous record price for a diamond was $305,000 which had been set in 1957.

A proviso of the sale stipulated that the diamond could be named by the buyer, and it was subsequently named the "Cartier Diamond".

=== Purchase by Burton and Taylor ===
Burton and Taylor had been in England at the time of the auction, staying at The Bell Inn in Aston Clinton in Buckinghamshire, where they were visiting Ifor Jenkins, Burton's brother. Burton's lawyer, Jim Benton, called him at the Bell Inn after the auction to tell him that he had been outbid. Burton later wrote of his reaction in his diary, writing that:

"I turned into a raving maniac and insisted that he get Aaron on the phone as soon as possible. Elizabeth was as sweet as only she could be and protested that it didn't matter, that she didn't mind if she didn't have it, that there was much more in life than baubles, that she would manage with what she had. The inference was that she would make do. But not me! ... I screamed at Aaron that bugger Cartiers, I was going to get that diamond if it cost me my life or 2 million dollars whichever was the greater. For 24 hours the agony persisted and in the end I won. I got the bloody thing".

Burton had spent the day after the auction by the payphone in the Bell Inn, after having instructed Frosch to buy the diamond from Cartier regardless of the price. The diamond was confirmed as theirs the next day, at a cost of $1.1 million. Burton also wrote in his diary that "I wanted that diamond because it is incomparably lovely ... and it should be on the loveliest woman in the world. I would have had a fit if it went to Jackie Kennedy or Sophia Loren or Mrs. Huntingdon Misfit of Dallas, Texas". The diamond was subsequently named the "Taylor Burton Diamond". Burton had previously bought Taylor the 33.19-carat Krupp Diamond in May 1968 at a cost of $307,000.

Burton and Taylor's jewels and other investments bought by the couple were officially assets of a tax shelter established by the pair, called the Atlantic Corporation.

=== Public exhibition ===
Kenmore had agreed to sell the diamond if it could be displayed at Cartier's stores in New York and Chicago, and after taking out a large advert in the New York Times to announce the public viewing, an estimated 6,000 people queued to see the diamond every day. The diamond also appeared as a guest on The Ed Sullivan Show.

The publicity surrounding the purchase of the diamond was criticised in an editorial in The New York Times which said that

"The peasants have been lining up outside Cartier's this week to gawk at a diamond as big as the Ritz that costs well over a million dollars. It is destined to hang round the neck of Mrs. Richard Burton. As somebody said it would have been nice to wear in the tumbril on the way to the guillotine. ... In this Age of Vulgarity marked by such minor matters as war and poverty, it gets harder everyday to scale the heights of true vulgarity. But given some loose millions, it can be done--and worse, admired".

=== Debut in Monaco ===
After its public exhibitions the diamond was taken to Taylor and Burton in Monaco in November 1969, who were staying on their yacht, the Kalizma, in Monaco's Port Hercules. The diamond's journey to Monaco took three weeks, with the use of three men with identical briefcases, of which only one held the actual diamond. The men flew from New York to Nice in France, and upon entering Monaco an armed guard with a machine gun gave further protection to the diamond. The couple were in Monaco to celebrate Princess Grace's fortieth birthday at the 'Scorpio Ball', a gala ball held at the Hôtel Hermitage in Monte Carlo. The briefcase that contained the diamond also held three 50¢ pairs of stockings that Taylor would buy in New York and were unavailable elsewhere, and Taylor was just as excited to receive the stockings as the diamond.

At the Scorpio Ball Taylor wore the diamond with the Krupp Diamond, which Burton had bought for her in 1968, and the "Ping Pong" diamond, which was only 1/8 of a carat. The "Ping Pong" diamond had cost only $14 and had been bought for her by Burton after he promised her a diamond if she beat him by ten points at a game of ping pong. When people praised her diamonds at the ball, Taylor would make a show of pretending that they were praising the Ping Pong diamond and not its much larger counterparts. Burton wrote in his diary that "Elizabeth's delight in it is a joy to behold and a very quaint thing to witness is the obvious pleasure that other people take in her wearing it. Even Hjordis Niven and Princess Grace, who are coldish fish, seemed to enjoy her moment. And of course nobody can wear it better. The miraculous face and shoulders and breasts set it off to perfection".

=== Later history and sale ===
Taylor subsequently wore the diamond at the 42nd Academy Awards on 7 April 1970, where she wore a dress designed by Edith Head. Taylor presented the Academy Award for Best Picture to Midnight Cowboy at the ceremony.

A $1 million insurance policy was secured against the diamond with Lloyd's of London. The terms set by Lloyd's stipulated that it could only be publicly worn for thirty days in any given year, that it be stored in a vault, and that Taylor was to be accompanied by armed guards when wearing it in public. Taylor would later have a replica made of the diamond that cost $2,800.

After her second divorce from Burton in 1978, Taylor sold the diamond in June 1979 to Henry Lambert, a jeweller from New York for a figure believed to between $3–5 million. Part of the proceeds from the sale funded the construction of a hospital in Botswana. Taylor and Burton's second marriage had taken place in Botswana in 1975. Lambert sold the Taylor–Burton Diamond in December 1979 to Robert Mouawad, of the jewellers Mouawad.

== See also ==
- Elizabeth Taylor Diamond, bought by Burton for Taylor in 1968
- List of diamonds

== References and sources ==
=== Sources ===
- Balfour, Ian (2009). Famous Diamonds. London: Antique Collectors Club. ISBN 978-1-85149-479-8.
- Burton, Richard (2012). The Richard Burton Diaries. New York: Yale University Press. ISBN 978-0-300-18010-7.
- Kashner, Sam; Schoenberger, Nancy (2010). Furious Love. London: JR Books. ISBN 978-1-907532-22-1.
- Kelley, Kitty (1981). Elizabeth Taylor, the Last Star. Simon and Schuster. p. 228. ISBN 978-0-671-25543-5.
