= Loni Anderson =

American actress (1945–2025)

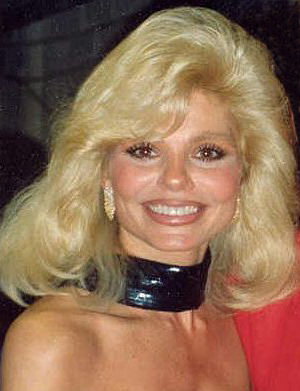
- Anderson in 1992
- Born: Loni Kaye Anderson; August 5, 1945; Saint Paul, Minnesota, U.S.
- Died: August 3, 2025; Los Angeles, California, U.S.
- Occupation: Actress
- Years active: 1966–2023
- Known for: WKRP in Cincinnati, Nurses (Season 3)
- Spouses: Bruce Hasselberg (m. 1964; div. 1966); Ross Bickell (m. 1974; div. 1981); Burt Reynolds (m. 1988; div. 1994); Bob Flick (m. 2008)
- Children: 2

Loni Kaye Anderson (August 5, 1945 – August 3, 2025) was an American actress. She is best known for playing receptionist Jennifer Marlowe on the CBS sitcom WKRP in Cincinnati (1978–1982), which earned her nominations for three Golden Globe Awards and two Emmy Awards.

== Early life and education ==
Anderson was born in Saint Paul, Minnesota, on August 5, 1945, the daughter of Klaydon Carl "Andy" Anderson (1922–1977), an environmental chemist, and Maxine Hazel (née Kallin, 1924–1985), a onetime model. She grew up in suburban Roseville, Minnesota. As a senior at Alexander Ramsey Senior High School, she was voted Queen of the Valentine's Day Winter Formal of 1963. As she stated in her autobiography My Life in High Heels, her father was going to name her Leilani, but he realized that when she got to her teen years, it was likely to be twisted (into "Lay" Lani) so it was changed to simply Loni. She had a sister, Andrea. According to Anderson, their maternal grandmother Hazel Kallin was a schoolteacher who also managed a Prohibition-era speakeasy-type dance hall. She studied art at the University of Minnesota.

== Career ==
Anderson's acting debut came with a bit part in the film Nevada Smith (1966), starring Steve McQueen. After that, she was mostly unemployed as an actress for nearly a decade, then she received guest roles on television series in the mid-1970s. She appeared in two episodes of S.W.A.T., then on the sitcom Phyllis, and on the detective series Police Woman and Harry O. She auditioned for the role of Chrissy on the sitcom Three's Company. She did not win the role, but in 1978 guest-starred as Susan Walters on a Season Two episode.

Anderson's most famous acting role came as the sultry receptionist Jennifer Marlowe on the sitcom WKRP in Cincinnati (1978–1982). She was offered the role when producers saw a poster of her in a red swimsuit—a pose similar to Farrah Fawcett's famous 1976 poster. Hugh Wilson, the sitcom's creator, later said Anderson got the role because her body resembled Jayne Mansfield's and because she possessed the innocent sexuality of Marilyn Monroe. For her role, she was nominated for three Golden Globe Awards and two Emmy Awards. Although the series suffered in the Nielsen ratings throughout most of its four-year run, it had a strong following among teens, young adults, and disc jockeys. Owing to her rising popularity as the series' so-called "main attraction", Anderson walked out on the sitcom during the 1980 summer hiatus, requesting a substantial salary increase. While she was renegotiating her contract, she starred in the television film The Jayne Mansfield Story (1980). When the network agreed to her requests, she returned to the series and remained until its cancellation in 1982.

Aside from her acting career, Anderson became known for her colorful personal life, particularly her relationship with and marriage to actor Burt Reynolds. They starred in the comedy film Stroker Ace (1983), which was a critical and box-office failure. She later appeared as herself in the romantic comedy The Lonely Guy (1984), starring Steve Martin. She voiced Flo, a collie in the animated film All Dogs Go to Heaven (1989).

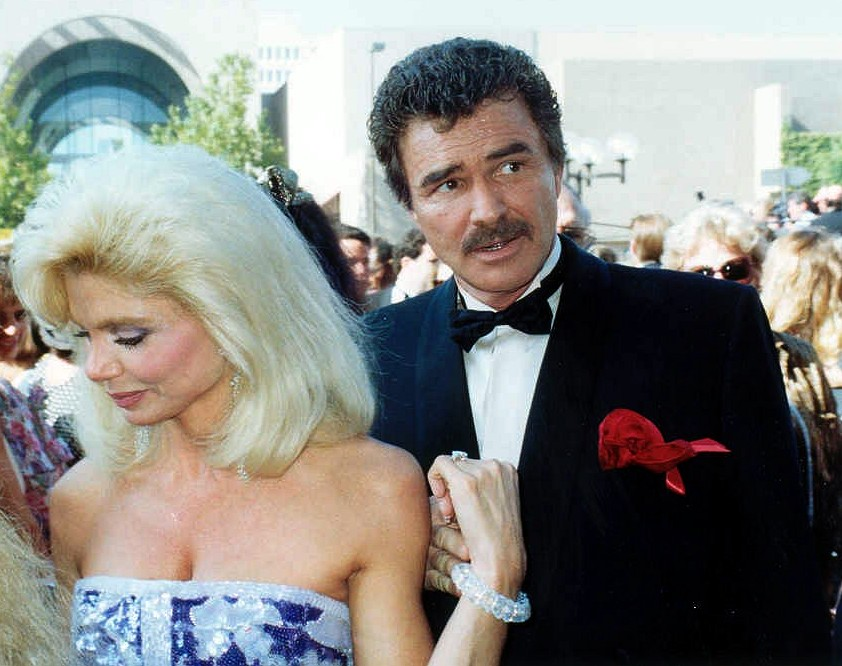
Anderson with her third husband Burt Reynolds at the 1991 Emmy Awards

In the mid-to-late 1980s, Anderson was teamed with Wonder Woman actress Lynda Carter in the television series Partners in Crime (1984). Anderson later starred in a short-lived comedy series Easy Street (1986–1987). She appeared in television adaptations of classic Hollywood films, such as A Letter to Three Wives (1985) with Michele Lee, and Sorry, Wrong Number (1989), both of which received little attention. After starring in Coins in the Fountain (1990), Anderson received praise for her portrayal of comedian actress Thelma Todd in the television movie White Hot: The Mysterious Murder of Thelma Todd (1991).

In the early 1990s, she attempted to co-star with Reynolds on his sitcom Evening Shade, but the network was not fond of the idea and she was replaced by Marilu Henner. After Delta Burke was fired from the sitcom Designing Women in 1991, producers offered Anderson a role as Burke's replacement. However, the network balked at Anderson's salary demand. She agreed to return as Jennifer Marlowe on two episodes of The New WKRP in Cincinnati, a sequel to the original series. In 1993, Anderson was added to the third and final season of the sitcom Nurses, playing hospital administrator Casey MacAffee. Her subsequent roles included those in the television series Clueless, Sabrina the Teenage Witch, and Melrose Place, and the films 3 Ninjas: High Noon at Mega Mountain and A Night at the Roxbury (both 1998).

Anderson's autobiography My Life in High Heels was published in 1995. Growing up with parents who both smoked, Anderson witnessed the effects of chronic obstructive pulmonary disease (COPD), a lung disease often caused by smoking. In 1999, she became a spokesperson for a COPD support organization named COPD Together.

In April 2018, Anderson was seen promoting WKRP in Cincinnati and other television series on the MeTV television network. Though less frequent since the start of the 21st century, Anderson continued to act in television series, and played a lead role in the 2016–2020 web series My Sister is So Gay. On October 3, 2023, it was announced that Anderson would feature in the Lifetime film Ladies of the '80s: A Divas Christmas. According to the official synopsis, the movie follows five soap opera divas readying for a reunion show who take on playing cupid during Christmas to bring together their director and producer as they all learn the meaning of the true Christmas spirit. The ensemble cast was made up of Anderson, Linda Gray, Morgan Fairchild, Donna Mills, and Nicollette Sheridan.

== Personal life and death ==
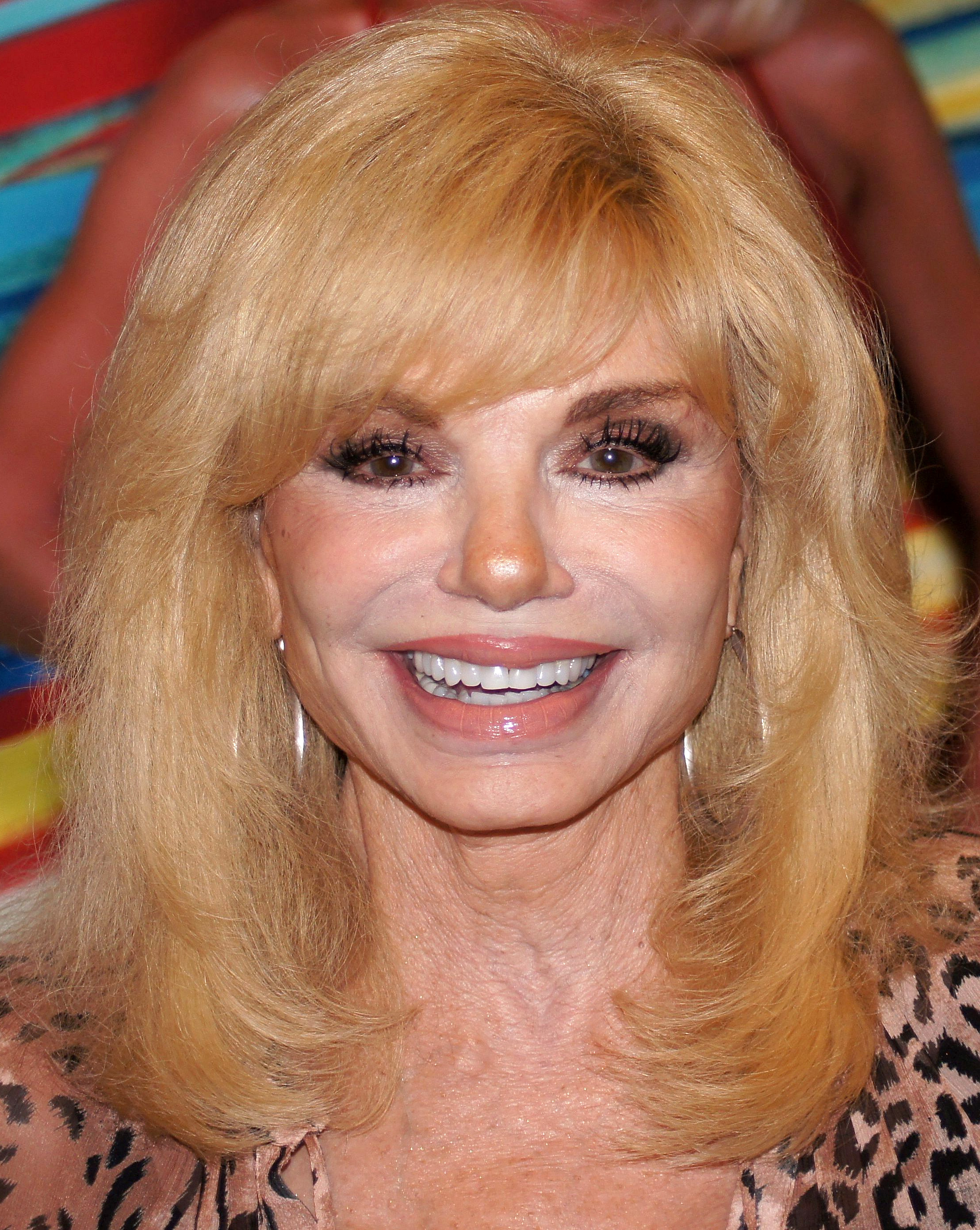
Anderson in 2019

Anderson was married four times: to real estate developer Bruce Hasselberg (1964–1966), actor Ross Bickell (1974–1981), actor Burt Reynolds (1988–1994), and musician Bob Flick (2008 until her death). Flick, a founding member of the folk band the Brothers Four, first met Anderson at a movie premiere in Minneapolis in 1963. She had an acknowledged affair with her WKRP in Cincinnati co-star Gary Sandy near the end of her marriage with Bickell.

Anderson had two children: a daughter, Deidra (fathered by Hasselberg), and a son, Quinton (adopted with Reynolds). She had four grandchildren.

Anderson died at Cedars-Sinai Medical Center of metastatic uterine leiomyosarcoma on August 3, 2025, at the age of 79. She was cremated and interred at Hollywood Forever Cemetery.

== Filmography ==
=== Film ===
Year	Title	Role	Notes
1976	Vigilante Force	Peaches	uncredited
1983	Stroker Ace	Pembrook Feeny	
1984	The Lonely Guy	Herself	uncredited
1989	All Dogs Go to Heaven	Flo	voice
1992	Munchie	Cathy	
1998	3 Ninjas: High Noon at Mega Mountain	Medusa	
1998	A Night at the Roxbury	Barbara Butabi	final film role

=== Television films ===
Year	Title	Role	Notes
1977	The Magnificent Magical Magnet of Santa Mesa	Mrs. Daroon	
1978	Three on a Date	Angela Ross	
1980	The Jayne Mansfield Story	Jayne Mansfield	
1980	The Fantastic Funnies	self (host)	
1981	Sizzle	Julie Davis	
1982	Country Gold	Mollie Dean Purcell	
1984	My Mother's Secret Life	Ellen Blake	
1985	A Letter to Three Wives	Lora Mae Holloway	
1986	Stranded	Stacy Tweed	
1986	Easy Street	L.K. MCGuire	
1987	Blondie & Dagwood	Blondie Bumstead	voice
1988	Necessity	Lauren LaSalle	
1988	Whisper Kill	Liz Bartlett	
1988	Too Good to Be True	Ellen Berent	
1989	Sorry, Wrong Number	Madeleine Stevenson	
1989	Blondie & Dagwood: Second Wedding Workout	Blondie Bumstead	voice
1990	Coins in the Fountain	Leah	
1990	Blown Away	Lauren	
1991	White Hot: The Mysterious Murder of Thelma Todd	Thelma Todd	
1992	The Price She Paid	Lacey	
1994	Gambler V: Playing for Keeps	Fanny Porter	
1994	Without Warning	Actress in the opening movie segment	uncredited
1995	Deadly Family Secrets	Martha	
2023	Ladies of the '80s: A Divas Christmas	Lily Marlowe	

=== Television series ===
Year	Title	Role	Notes
1975	S.W.A.T.	Miss Texas	Episode: "The Steel Security Blanket"
1975	S.W.A.T.	Art Teacher	Episode: "Deadly Tide: Part 1"
1975	The Invisible Man	Andrea Hanover	Episode: "Man of Influence"
1975	Harry O	Linzy	Episode: "Lester Two"
1975	Phyllis	Rita	Episode: "The First Date"
1975	Police Woman	Waitress	Episode: "Farewell, Mary Jane"
1976	Police Story	Waitress	Episode: "Odyssey of Death: Part 2"
1976	Barnaby Jones	Dee Dee Danvers	Episode: "Deadly Reunion"
1976	Barnaby Jones	Joanna Morgan	Episode: "Sins of Thy Father"
1976	The McLean Stevenson Show	Mrs. Swenson	Episode: "Going His Way"
1977	The Bob Newhart Show	Leslie Greely	Episode: "Carlin's New Suit"
1977	The Love Boat	Barbie	Episode: "Lost and Found/The Understudy/Married Singles"
1978–82	WKRP in Cincinnati	Jennifer Marlowe	89 episodes
1978	The Incredible Hulk	Sheila Cantrell	Episode: "Of Guilt, Models and Murder"
1978	Three's Company	Susan Walters	Episode: "Coffee, Tea, or Jack"
1980	The Love Boat	Kitty Scofield	Episode: "The Kinfolk / Sis and the Slicker / Moonlight and Moonshine / Affair"
1980	Fantasy Island	Kim Holland	Episode: "The Love Doctor / Pleasure Palace / Possessed"
1984	Partners in Crime aka Fifty-Fifty	Sydney Kovak	13 episodes
1985	Amazing Stories	Love	Episode: "The Guilt Trip"
1986–87	Easy Street	L.K. McGuire	22 episodes
1990	B.L. Stryker	Dawn St. Claire	Episode: "Grand Theft Hotel"
1991–92	The New WKRP in Cincinnati	Jennifer Marlowe	2 episodes
1993	Empty Nest	Casey MacAfee	3 episodes
1993–94	Nurses	Casey MacAfee	22 episodes
1995	Burke's Law	Claudia Loring	Episode: "Who Killed the Highest Bidder?"
1995	Women of the House	Loni Anderson	Episode: "Women in Film"
1996	Melrose Place	Teri Carson	3 episodes
1997	Sabrina the Teenage Witch	Racine	Episode: "Witch Trash"
1998	Clueless	Barbara Collier	Episode: "Labor of Love"
1999	Movie Stars	Audrey Wyatt	Episode: "Mothers & Brothers"
1999	V.I.P.	Carol Irons	Episode: "Stop or Val's Mom Will Shoot"
2001	Three Sisters	Janet	Episode: "Mother's Day"
2003–04	The Mullets	Mandi Mullet-Heidecker	11 episodes
2006	So Notorious	Kiki Spelling	8 episodes
2016	Baby Daddy	Nana Lyle	Episode: "Not So Great Grandma"
2016–18	My Sister Is So Gay	Frances	12 episodes
2017	Love You More	Jean Carlyle-Dixon	TV pilot

== Book ==
- Anderson, Loni; Warren, Larkin (1995). My Life in High Heels. New York: William Morrow and Company. ISBN 978-0-688-14272-8. OCLC 32703710.
