= List of awards and nominations received by ER =

List of awards and nominations for ER
Awards and nominations
Award	Wins	Nominations
7 d'Or	1	1
ACE Eddie Awards	2	4
ALMA Awards	1	9
American Society of Cinematographers Awards	2	2
Artios Awards	4	7
ASCAP Film and Television Music Awards	12	12
BET Awards	0	1
BMI Film and TV Awards	11	11
British Academy Television Awards	1	1
Cinema Audio Society Awards	1	5
Directors Guild of America Awards	4	12
Environmental Media Awards	1	1
GLAAD Media Awards	0	4
Golden Globe Awards	1	25
Golden Reel Awards	5	19
Golden Televizier-Ring Gala	1	2
Humanitas Prize	1	9
Imagen Awards	0	2
Logie Awards	0	3
NAACP Image Awards	6	33
National Television Awards	0	2
Peabody Awards	1	1
People's Choice Awards	10	13
Primetime Emmy Awards	23	124
PRISM Awards	9	29
Producers Guild of America Awards	2	3
Q Awards	8	25
Satellite Awards	0	7
Screen Actors Guild Awards	8	18
Shanghai Television Festival	1	1
TCA Awards	2	8
Teen Choice Awards	0	4
Telegatto	1	5
TV Guide Awards	3	9
TV Land Awards	1	2
Visual Effects Society Awards	1	2
Writers Guild of America Awards	1	5
Young Artist Awards	3	20
YoungStar Awards	0	1

Totals (Note: Certain award groups do not simply award one winner. They acknowledge several different recipients, have runners-up, and have third place. Since this is a specific recognition and is different from losing an award, runner-up mentions are considered wins in this award tally. For simplification and to avoid errors, each award in this list has been presumed to have had a prior nomination.)
- Wins: 128
- Nominations: 442

ER is an American medical drama television series created by Michael Crichton that aired on NBC from September 19, 1994, to April 2, 2009. It was produced by Constant c Productions and Amblin Television, in association with Warner Bros. Television. The series follows the inner life of the emergency room (ER) of fictional Cook County General Hospital in Chicago, and various critical issues faced by the department's physicians and staff.

ER has received critical acclaim for its acting, directing, writing and technical achievements, and is regarded as one of the greatest television series of all time. Since its debut in 1994, the series has been nominated for 124 Primetime Emmy Awards (with 23 wins), 25 Golden Globe Awards (with one win), 18 Screen Actors Guild Awards (with eight wins), 12 Directors Guild of America Awards (with four wins), 8 TCA Awards (with two wins), 5 Writers Guild of America Awards (with one win), and 3 Producers Guild of America Awards (with two wins). By the end of its run, ER was the most Emmy-nominated primetime television series in history with 124 nominations, a record later surpassed by Game of Thrones in 2018. It won 23 awards including Outstanding Supporting Actress in a Drama Series for Julianna Margulies in 1995 and Outstanding Drama Series for the series' second season in 1996.

== Awards and nominations ==
Awards and nominations received by ER
Award	Year (Note: The listed year refers to the date of the ceremony, not necessarily the year in which the corresponding season or episode aired.)	Category	Nominee(s)	Result	Ref.
7 d'Or	1996	Best Foreign TV Series	ER	Won	
ACE Eddie Awards	1996	Best Edited One-Hour Series for Television	Randy Jon Morgan, Rick Tuber (for "Love's Labor Lost")	Won	
ACE Eddie Awards	1997	Best Edited One-Hour Series for Television	Randy Jon Morgan (for "The Healers")	Nominated	
ACE Eddie Awards	1998	Best Edited One-Hour Series for Television	Randy Jon Morgan (for "The Long Way Around")	Won	
ACE Eddie Awards	2010	Best Edited One-Hour Series for Commercial Television	Randy Jon Morgan, Jacque Elaine Toberen (for "And in the End...")	Nominated	
ALMA Awards	1998	Outstanding Actress in a Drama Series	Laura Cerón	Nominated	
ALMA Awards	1999	Outstanding Actress in a Drama Series	Laura Cerón	Nominated	
ALMA Awards	2000	Outstanding Actress in a Television Series	Laura Cerón	Won	
ALMA Awards	2001	Outstanding Actress in a Television Series	Laura Cerón	Nominated	
ALMA Awards	2002	Outstanding Supporting Actor in a Television Series	Demetrius Navarro	Nominated	
ALMA Awards	2002	Outstanding Supporting Actress in a Television Series	Lourdes Benedicto	Nominated	
ALMA Awards	2002	Outstanding Director of a Television Drama or Comedy	Félix Enríquez Alcalá (for "Never Say Never")	Nominated	
ALMA Awards	2009	Year in TV Drama – Actress	Laura Cerón	Nominated	
ALMA Awards	2009	Year in TV Drama – Actress	Justina Machado	Nominated	
American Society of Cinematographers Awards	1995	Outstanding Achievement in Cinematography in a Movie of the Week or Pilot	Thomas Del Ruth (for "24 Hours")	Won	
American Society of Cinematographers Awards	1995	Outstanding Achievement in Cinematography in Regular Series	Thomas Del Ruth (for "Day One")	Won	
Artios Awards	1995	Best Casting for TV, Pilot	John Frank Levey	Won	
Artios Awards	1995	Best Casting for TV, Dramatic Episodic	John Frank Levey	Won	
Artios Awards	1996	Best Casting for TV, Dramatic Episodic	John Frank Levey	Won	
Artios Awards	1997	Best Casting for TV, Dramatic Episodic	John Frank Levey	Won	
Artios Awards	1998	Best Casting for TV, Dramatic Episodic	John Frank Levey, Barbara Miller, John Alderman	Nominated	
Artios Awards	1999	Best Casting for TV, Dramatic Episodic	John Frank Levey, Barbara Miller	Nominated	
Artios Awards	2000	Best Casting for TV, Dramatic Episodic	John Frank Levey, Barbara Miller	Nominated	
ASCAP Film and Television Music Awards	1995	Top TV Series	James Newton Howard	Won	
ASCAP Film and Television Music Awards	1996	Top TV Series	James Newton Howard	Won	
ASCAP Film and Television Music Awards	1997	Top TV Series	James Newton Howard	Won	
ASCAP Film and Television Music Awards	1998	Top TV Series	James Newton Howard	Won	
ASCAP Film and Television Music Awards	1999	Top TV Series	James Newton Howard	Won	
ASCAP Film and Television Music Awards	2000	Top TV Series	James Newton Howard	Won	
ASCAP Film and Television Music Awards	2001	Top TV Series	James Newton Howard	Won	
ASCAP Film and Television Music Awards	2002	Top TV Series	James Newton Howard	Won	
ASCAP Film and Television Music Awards	2003	Top TV Series	James Newton Howard	Won	
ASCAP Film and Television Music Awards	2004	Top TV Series	James Newton Howard	Won	
ASCAP Film and Television Music Awards	2005	Top TV Series	James Newton Howard	Won	
ASCAP Film and Television Music Awards	2006	Top TV Series	James Newton Howard	Won	
BET Awards	2009	Best Actress	Angela Bassett (Note: Shared with Notorious)	Nominated	
BMI Film and TV Awards	1995	BMI TV Music Award	Martin Davich	Won	
BMI Film and TV Awards	1996	BMI TV Music Award	Martin Davich	Won	
BMI Film and TV Awards	1997	BMI TV Music Award	Martin Davich	Won	
BMI Film and TV Awards	1998	BMI TV Music Award	Martin Davich	Won	
BMI Film and TV Awards	1999	BMI TV Music Award	Martin Davich	Won	
BMI Film and TV Awards	2000	BMI TV Music Award	Martin Davich	Won	
BMI Film and TV Awards	2001	BMI TV Music Award	Martin Davich	Won	
BMI Film and TV Awards	2002	BMI TV Music Award	Martin Davich	Won	
BMI Film and TV Awards	2003	BMI TV Music Award	Martin Davich (Note: Shared with Third Watch)	Won	
BMI Film and TV Awards	2004	BMI TV Music Award	Martin Davich	Won	
BMI Film and TV Awards	2005	BMI TV Music Award	Martin Davich	Won	
British Academy Television Awards	1996	Foreign Programme Award	ER	Won	
Cinema Audio Society Awards	1995	Outstanding Achievement in Sound Mixing for Television – Series	Allen L. Stone, Frank Jones, Michael E. Jiron, Russell C. Fager (for "Blizzard")	Nominated	
Cinema Audio Society Awards	1996	Outstanding Achievement in Sound Mixing for Television – Series	Allen L. Stone, Frank Jones, Michael E. Jiron, Will Yarbrough (for "Hell and High Water")	Won	
Cinema Audio Society Awards	1997	Outstanding Achievement in Sound Mixing for Television – Series	Allen L. Stone, Frank Jones, Michael E. Jiron, Lowell Harris (for "Fear of Flying")	Nominated	
Cinema Audio Society Awards	1999	Outstanding Achievement in Sound Mixing for Television – Series	Allen L. Stone, Michael E. Jiron, David Concors, Lowell Harris (for "Exodus")	Nominated	
Cinema Audio Society Awards	2000	Outstanding Achievement in Sound Mixing for Television – Series	Allen L. Stone, Michael E. Jiron, David Concors, Marc A. Gilmartin (for "The Storm (Part II)")	Nominated	
Directors Guild of America Awards	1995	Outstanding Directorial Achievement in Dramatic Specials	Rod Holcomb (for "24 Hours")	Won	
Directors Guild of America Awards	1995	Outstanding Directorial Achievement in Dramatic Series – Night	Charles Haid (for "Into That Good Night")	Won	
Directors Guild of America Awards	1995	Outstanding Directorial Achievement in Dramatic Series – Night	Mimi Leder (for "Blizzard")	Nominated	
Directors Guild of America Awards	1995	Outstanding Directorial Achievement in Dramatic Series – Night	Félix Enríquez Alcalá (for "The Gift")	Nominated	
Directors Guild of America Awards	1996	Outstanding Directorial Achievement in Dramatic Series – Night	Mimi Leder (for "Love's Labor Lost")	Nominated	
Directors Guild of America Awards	1996	Outstanding Directorial Achievement in Dramatic Series – Night	Félix Enríquez Alcalá (for "Do One, Reach One, Kill One")	Nominated	
Directors Guild of America Awards	1996	Outstanding Directorial Achievement in Dramatic Series – Night	Christopher Chulack (for "Hell and High Water")	Won	
Directors Guild of America Awards	1997	Outstanding Directorial Achievement in Dramatic Series – Night	Mimi Leder (for "The Healers")	Nominated	
Directors Guild of America Awards	1997	Outstanding Directorial Achievement in Dramatic Series – Night	Christopher Chulack (for "Fear of Flying")	Won	
Directors Guild of America Awards	1997	Outstanding Directorial Achievement in Dramatic Series – Night	Paris Barclay (for "Ask Me No Questions, I'll Tell You No Lies")	Nominated	
Directors Guild of America Awards	1998	Outstanding Directorial Achievement in Dramatic Series – Night	Christopher Chulack (for "Fathers and Sons")	Nominated	
Directors Guild of America Awards	2005	Outstanding Directorial Achievement in Dramatic Series – Night	Christopher Chulack (Note: Additional nominees: Tommy Burns (unit production manager); Princess O'Mahoney (first assistant director); Ronan O'Connor (second assistant director); Deborah Greaney Donovan (second second assistant director); Tony Eng (second second assistant director)) (for "Time of Death")	Nominated	
Environmental Media Awards	1998	Turner Award	"Shades of Gray"	Won	
GLAAD Media Awards	1998	Outstanding TV Drama Series	ER	Nominated	
GLAAD Media Awards	1999	Outstanding TV Individual Episode	"Stuck on You"	Nominated	
GLAAD Media Awards	2002	Outstanding Drama Series	ER	Nominated	
GLAAD Media Awards	2009	Outstanding Individual Episode	"Tandem Repeats"	Nominated	
Golden Globe Awards	1995	Best Television Series – Drama	ER	Nominated	
Golden Globe Awards	1996	Best Television Series – Drama	ER	Nominated	
Golden Globe Awards	1996	Best Performance by an Actor in a Television Series – Drama	Anthony Edwards	Nominated	
Golden Globe Awards	1996	Best Performance by an Actor in a Television Series – Drama	George Clooney	Nominated	
Golden Globe Awards	1996	Best Performance by an Actress in a Television Series – Drama	Sherry Stringfield	Nominated	
Golden Globe Awards	1996	Best Performance by an Actress in a Supporting Role in a Series, Miniseries or Motion Picture Made for Television	Julianna Margulies	Nominated	
Golden Globe Awards	1997	Best Television Series – Drama	ER	Nominated	
Golden Globe Awards	1997	Best Performance by an Actor in a Television Series – Drama	Anthony Edwards	Nominated	
Golden Globe Awards	1997	Best Performance by an Actor in a Television Series – Drama	George Clooney	Nominated	
Golden Globe Awards	1997	Best Performance by an Actress in a Television Series – Drama	Sherry Stringfield	Nominated	
Golden Globe Awards	1997	Best Performance by an Actor in a Supporting Role in a Series, Miniseries or Motion Picture Made for Television	Noah Wyle	Nominated	
Golden Globe Awards	1998	Best Television Series – Drama	ER	Nominated	
Golden Globe Awards	1998	Best Performance by an Actor in a Television Series – Drama	Anthony Edwards	Won	
Golden Globe Awards	1998	Best Performance by an Actor in a Television Series – Drama	George Clooney	Nominated	
Golden Globe Awards	1998	Best Performance by an Actress in a Television Series – Drama	Julianna Margulies	Nominated	
Golden Globe Awards	1998	Best Performance by an Actor in a Supporting Role in a Series, Miniseries or Motion Picture Made for Television	Noah Wyle	Nominated	
Golden Globe Awards	1998	Best Performance by an Actor in a Supporting Role in a Series, Miniseries or Motion Picture Made for Television	Eriq La Salle	Nominated	
Golden Globe Awards	1998	Best Performance by an Actress in a Supporting Role in a Series, Miniseries or Motion Picture Made for Television	Gloria Reuben	Nominated	
Golden Globe Awards	1999	Best Television Series – Drama	ER	Nominated	
Golden Globe Awards	1999	Best Performance by an Actor in a Television Series – Drama	Anthony Edwards	Nominated	
Golden Globe Awards	1999	Best Performance by an Actress in a Television Series – Drama	Julianna Margulies	Nominated	
Golden Globe Awards	1999	Best Performance by an Actor in a Supporting Role in a Series, Miniseries or Motion Picture Made for Television	Noah Wyle	Nominated	
Golden Globe Awards	2000	Best Television Series – Drama	ER	Nominated	
Golden Globe Awards	2000	Best Performance by an Actress in a Television Series – Drama	Julianna Margulies	Nominated	
Golden Globe Awards	2001	Best Television Series – Drama	ER	Nominated	
Golden Reel Awards	1998	Best Sound Editing – Television Episodic – Effects & Foley		Nominated	
Golden Reel Awards	1999	Best Sound Editing – Television Episodic – Dialogue & ADR	Walter Newman, Darleen Stoker, Thomas A. Harris, Catherine Flynn (Note: Additional crew: Lisa Wolf Grove, Kevin B. Barron, Derron Street, Kenneth Fewell (assistant sound editors); Erin Donovan, Sally Ann Brooks (voice casting); Lowell Harris (production sound mixer); Allen L. Stone (re-recording mixers)) (for "Exodus")	Won	
Golden Reel Awards	1999	Best Sound Editing – Television Episodic – Effects & Foley	Walter Newman, Darren Wright, Rick Camara (Note: Additional crew: Renne Cuyugan, Lisa Wolf Grove (assistant sound editors); Casey Crabtree, James Bailey (foley artists); Allen L. Stone, Michael E. Jiron, David Concors (re-recording mixers)) (for "Exodus")	Won	
Golden Reel Awards	2000	Best Sound Editing – Television Episodic – Dialogue & ADR	Walter Newman, Darleen Stoker, Thomas A. Harris, Bruce M. Honda (Note: Additional crew: Lisa Wolf Grove, Kevin B. Barron, Kenneth Fewell (assistant ADR editors); Erin Donovan, Sally Ann Brooks (voice casting); Marc A. Gilmartin (production mixer); Allen L. Stone (re-recording mixer); Troy Porter (ADR mixer); Laverne Dewberry (ADR recordist)) (for "The Storm (Part II)")	Nominated	
Golden Reel Awards	2000	Best Sound Editing – Television Episodic – Effects & Foley	Walter Newman, Darren Wright, Rick Camara, Rick Hromadka (Note: Additional crew: Lisa Wolf Grove, Kenneth Fewell (assistant sound editors); Casey J. Crabtree, James Bailey (foley artists); Allen L. Stone, Michael E. Jiron, David Concors (re-recording mixers); Al Gomez (foley mixer and recordist)) (for "The Storm (Part II)")	Won	
Golden Reel Awards	2001	Best Sound Editing – Television Episodic – Dialogue & ADR	Walter Newman, Darleen Stoker, Thomas A. Harris, Karyn Foster (Note: Additional crew: Lisa Wolf Grove, Kevin B. Barron (assistant ADR editors); Marc A. Gilmartin (production mixer); Allen L. Stone (re-recording mixer); Troy Porter (ADR mixer); Laverne Dewberry (ADR recordist)) (for "May Day")	Nominated	
Golden Reel Awards	2001	Best Sound Editing – Television Episodic – Effects & Foley	Walter Newman, Darren Wright, Rick Camara (Note: Additional crew: Lisa Wolf Grove (assistant sound editor); Casey J. Crabtree, Michael Crabtree (foley artists); Marc A. Gilmartin (field recordist); Allen L. Stone, Michael E. Jiron, David Concors (re-recording mixers); Al Gomez (foley mixer)) (for "All in the Family")	Nominated	
Golden Reel Awards	2002	Best Sound Editing in Television – Effects & Foley, Episodic	Walter Newman, Darren Wright, David Wertz, Rick Hromadka, Stuart Calderon (Note: Additional crew: Lisa Wolf Grove, Deron Street (assistant sound editors); Casey J. Crabtree, Michael Crabtree (foley artists); James Clark (field recordist); Michael E. Jiron, David Concors, Allen L. Stone (re-recording mixers); Al Gomez (foley mixer)) (for "The Crossing")	Nominated	
Golden Reel Awards	2003	Best Sound Editing in Television Episodic – Dialogue & ADR	Walter Newman, Darleen Stoker, Thomas A. Harris, Karen Spangenberg, Virginia Cook-McGowan (for "Partly Cloudy, Chance of Rain")	Won	
Golden Reel Awards	2003	Best Sound Editing in Television Episodic – Sound Effects & Foley	Walter Newman, Darren Wright, David Wertz, Rick Hromadka, Kenneth Young (for "Chaos Theory")	Nominated	
Golden Reel Awards	2004	Best Sound Editing in Television Episodic – Dialogue & ADR	Walter Newman, Darleen Stoker, Thomas A. Harris, Catherine Flynn, Richard Corwyn (for "Kisangani")	Nominated	
Golden Reel Awards	2004	Best Sound Editing in Television Episodic – Sound Effects & Foley	Walter Newman, Amber Funk, Darren Wright, David Wertz, Rick Hromadka, Kenneth Young (for "When Night Meets Day")	Nominated	
Golden Reel Awards	2006	Best Sound Editing in Television Short Form – Dialogue and Automated Dialogue Replacement	Walter Newman, Darleen Stoker, Thomas A. Harris, Bruce M. Honda (Note: Additional crew: Lisa Wolf Grove, Deron Street, Sonny Pettijohn, Kevin B. Barron, Damon Cohoon (assistant dialogue/ADR editors); James Clark (production sound mixer); Troy Porter (ADR mixer); Adam Sawelson (dialogue re-recording mixer)) (for "Two Ships")	Nominated	
Golden Reel Awards	2006	Best Sound Editing in Television Short Form – Sound Effects & Foley	Walter Newman, Kenneth Young, Darren Wright, Rick Hromadka, Casey J. Crabtree, Michael Crabtree (Note: Additional crew: Lisa Wolf Grove, Kevin B. Barron, Deron Street (assistant sound editors); James Clark (field recordist); Al Gomez (foley mixer); Doug Davey, Adam Sawelson, David Concors (re-recording mixers)) (for "Two Ships")	Won	
Golden Reel Awards	2007	Best Sound Editing in Television Short Form – Dialogue and Automated Dialogue Replacement	Walter Newman, Darleen Stoker, Bob Redpath, Bruce M. Honda (Note: Additional crew: Kenneth Fewell, Deron Street, Sonja Pettijohn, Damon Cohoon, Eric Moss, Darren Knaus (assistant dialogue/ADR editors); James Clark (production sound mixer); Erin Donovan (loop group supervisor); Eric Gotthelf, Chris Munyon (ADR mixers); Adam Sawelson (dialogue re-recording mixer)) (for "Jigsaw")	Nominated	
Golden Reel Awards	2008	Best Sound Editing – Dialogue and Automated Dialogue Replacement for Short Form Television	Walter Newman, Al Gomez, Kenneth Young, Adam Johnston, Casey J. Crabtree, Michael Crabtree (for "Murmers of the Heart")	Nominated	
Golden Reel Awards	2008	Best Sound Editing – Music for Short Form Television	Sharyn M. Tylk (for "I Don't")	Nominated	
Golden Reel Awards	2008	Best Sound Editing – Sound Effects and Foley for Short Form Television	Walter Newman, Darleen Stoker, Bob Redpath, Bruce M. Honda (for "The War Comes Home")	Nominated	
Golden Reel Awards	2010	Best Sound Editing – Short Form Dialogue and ADR in Television	Walter Newman, Darleen Stoker, Bob Redpath, Bruce M. Honda (for "I Feel Good")	Nominated	
Golden Televizier-Ring Gala	1996	Silver Televizier-Tulip	ER	Nominated	
Golden Televizier-Ring Gala	1997	Silver Televizier-Tulip	ER	Won	
Humanitas Prize	1997	60 Minute	John Wells (for "The Healers")	Nominated	
Humanitas Prize	1999	60 Minute	Carol Flint (for "Family Practice")	Nominated	
Humanitas Prize	2002	60 Minute	John Wells (for "A Walk in the Woods")	Nominated	
Humanitas Prize	2004	60 Minute	John Wells (for "On the Beach")	Nominated	
Humanitas Prize	2005	60 Minute	John Wells (for "Makemba")	Nominated	
Humanitas Prize	2006	60 Minute	Dee Johnson (for "Alone in a Crowd")	Nominated	
Humanitas Prize	2007	60 Minute	Janine Sherman Barrois (for "Darfur")	Nominated	
Humanitas Prize	2008	60 Minute	R. Scott Gemmill, David Zabel (for "There Are No Angels Here")	Won	
Humanitas Prize	2010	60 Minute	David Zabel (for "Heal Thyself")	Nominated	
Imagen Awards	2006	Best Primetime Series	ER	Nominated	
Imagen Awards	2008	Best Primetime Series	ER	Nominated	
Logie Awards	2003	Most Popular Overseas Program	ER	Nominated	
Logie Awards	2004	Most Popular Overseas Drama	ER	Nominated	
Logie Awards	2005	Most Popular Overseas Program	ER	Nominated	
NAACP Image Awards	1996	Outstanding Drama Series	ER	Nominated	
NAACP Image Awards	1996	Outstanding Actor in a Drama Series	Eriq La Salle	Nominated	
NAACP Image Awards	1996	Outstanding Supporting Actress in a Drama Series	Gloria Reuben	Nominated	
NAACP Image Awards	1996	Outstanding Supporting Actress in a Drama Series	CCH Pounder	Nominated	
NAACP Image Awards	1997	Outstanding Drama Series	ER	Nominated	
NAACP Image Awards	1997	Outstanding Actor in a Drama Series	Eriq La Salle	Nominated	
NAACP Image Awards	1997	Outstanding Actress in a Drama Series	Gloria Reuben	Nominated	
NAACP Image Awards	1998	Outstanding Drama Series	ER	Nominated	
NAACP Image Awards	1998	Outstanding Actor in a Drama Series	Eriq La Salle	Nominated	
NAACP Image Awards	1998	Outstanding Supporting Actor in a Drama Series	Michael Beach	Nominated	
NAACP Image Awards	1998	Outstanding Supporting Actress in a Drama Series	Gloria Reuben	Nominated	
NAACP Image Awards	1998	Outstanding Supporting Actress in a Drama Series	CCH Pounder	Nominated	
NAACP Image Awards	1998	Outstanding Supporting Actress in a Drama Series	Lisa Nicole Carson	Nominated	
NAACP Image Awards	1999	Outstanding Drama Series	ER	Nominated	
NAACP Image Awards	1999	Outstanding Actor in a Drama Series	Eriq La Salle	Won	
NAACP Image Awards	1999	Outstanding Supporting Actress in a Drama Series	Gloria Reuben	Nominated	
NAACP Image Awards	2000	Outstanding Drama Series	ER	Nominated	
NAACP Image Awards	2000	Outstanding Actor in a Drama Series	Eriq La Salle	Won	
NAACP Image Awards	2000	Outstanding Supporting Actress in a Drama Series	Gloria Reuben	Nominated	
NAACP Image Awards	2001	Outstanding Actor in a Drama Series	Eriq La Salle	Nominated	
NAACP Image Awards	2001	Outstanding Supporting Actress in a Drama Series	Michael Michele	Nominated	
NAACP Image Awards	2002	Outstanding Drama Series	ER	Nominated	
NAACP Image Awards	2002	Outstanding Actor in a Drama Series	Eriq La Salle	Won	
NAACP Image Awards	2003	Outstanding Supporting Actor in a Drama Series	Mekhi Phifer	Nominated	
NAACP Image Awards	2004	Outstanding Supporting Actor in a Drama Series	Mekhi Phifer	Won	
NAACP Image Awards	2005	Outstanding Drama Series	ER	Nominated	
NAACP Image Awards	2005	Outstanding Supporting Actor in a Drama Series	Mekhi Phifer	Won	
NAACP Image Awards	2006	Outstanding Supporting Actor in a Drama Series	Mekhi Phifer	Nominated	
NAACP Image Awards	2007	Outstanding Writing in a Dramatic Series	Janine Sherman Barrois (for "Darfur")	Nominated	
NAACP Image Awards	2008	Outstanding Supporting Actor in a Drama Series	Mekhi Phifer	Nominated	
NAACP Image Awards	2008	Outstanding Writing in a Dramatic Series	Janine Sherman Barrois (for "Breach of Trust")	Nominated	
NAACP Image Awards	2009	Outstanding Supporting Actress in a Drama Series	Angela Bassett	Won	
NAACP Image Awards	2009	Outstanding Writing in a Dramatic Series	Janine Sherman Barrois (for "Parental Guidance")	Nominated	
National Television Awards	1997	Most Popular Drama Series	ER	Nominated	
National Television Awards	1997	Most Popular Actor	George Clooney	Nominated	
Peabody Awards	1995	Honoree (Note: Presented to NBC, Constant c Productions and Amblin Television, in association with Warner Bros. Television)		Honored	
People's Choice Awards	1995	Favorite New TV Dramatic Series	ER	Won	
People's Choice Awards	1995	Favorite Male Performer in a New TV Series	Anthony Edwards	Won	
People's Choice Awards	1995	Favorite TV Dramatic Series	ER	Won	
People's Choice Awards	1996	Favorite TV Dramatic Series	ER	Won	
People's Choice Awards	1997	Favorite TV Dramatic Series	ER	Won	
People's Choice Awards	1997	Favorite Male TV Performer	George Clooney	Nominated	
People's Choice Awards	1998	Favorite TV Dramatic Series	ER	Won	
People's Choice Awards	1999	Favorite TV Dramatic Series	ER	Won	
People's Choice Awards	2000	Favorite TV Dramatic Series	ER	Won	
People's Choice Awards	2001	Favorite TV Dramatic Series	ER	Won	
People's Choice Awards	2002	Favorite TV Dramatic Series	ER	Won	
People's Choice Awards	2003	Favorite TV Dramatic Series	ER	Nominated	
People's Choice Awards	2004	Favorite TV Dramatic Series	ER	Nominated	
Primetime Emmy Awards	1995	Outstanding Drama Series	ER (Note: Nominees: Christopher Chulack, Michael Crichton, Mimi Leder, Paul Manning, Dennis Murphy, Robert Nathan, John Wells, Lydia Woodward)	Nominated	
Primetime Emmy Awards	1995	Outstanding Lead Actor in a Drama Series	Anthony Edwards (for "Love's Labor Lost")	Nominated	
Primetime Emmy Awards	1995	Outstanding Lead Actor in a Drama Series	George Clooney (for "Long Day's Journey")	Nominated	
Primetime Emmy Awards	1995	Outstanding Lead Actress in a Drama Series	Sherry Stringfield (for "Motherhood")	Nominated	
Primetime Emmy Awards	1995	Outstanding Supporting Actor in a Drama Series	Noah Wyle (for "Hit and Run" and "Sleepless in Chicago")	Nominated	
Primetime Emmy Awards	1995	Outstanding Supporting Actor in a Drama Series	Eriq La Salle (for "9½ Hours" and "Everything Old Is New Again")	Nominated	
Primetime Emmy Awards	1995	Outstanding Supporting Actress in a Drama Series	Julianna Margulies (for "Make of Two Hearts" and "Sleepless in Chicago")	Won	
Primetime Emmy Awards	1995	Outstanding Individual Achievement in Directing in a Drama Series	Rod Holcomb (for "24 Hours")	Nominated	
Primetime Emmy Awards	1995	Outstanding Individual Achievement in Directing in a Drama Series	Mimi Leder (for "Love's Labor Lost")	Won	
Primetime Emmy Awards	1995	Outstanding Individual Achievement in Writing in a Drama Series	Michael Crichton (for "24 Hours")	Nominated	
Primetime Emmy Awards	1995	Outstanding Individual Achievement in Writing in a Drama Series	Lance Gentile (for "Love's Labor Lost")	Won	
Primetime Emmy Awards	1996	The President's Award		Nominated	
Primetime Emmy Awards	1996	Outstanding Drama Series	ER (Note: Nominees: Christopher Chulack, Michael Crichton, Carol Flint, Mimi Leder, Paul Manning, Wendy Spence Rosato, John Wells, Lydia Woodward)	Won	
Primetime Emmy Awards	1996	Outstanding Lead Actor in a Drama Series	Anthony Edwards (for "A Shift in the Night")	Nominated	
Primetime Emmy Awards	1996	Outstanding Lead Actor in a Drama Series	George Clooney (for "Hell and High Water")	Nominated	
Primetime Emmy Awards	1996	Outstanding Lead Actress in a Drama Series	Sherry Stringfield (for "Take These Broken Wings")	Nominated	
Primetime Emmy Awards	1996	Outstanding Supporting Actor in a Drama Series	Noah Wyle (for "The Right Thing" and "John Carter, M.D.")	Nominated	
Primetime Emmy Awards	1996	Outstanding Supporting Actress in a Drama Series	Julianna Margulies (for "Home" and "The Healers")	Nominated	
Primetime Emmy Awards	1996	Outstanding Directing for a Drama Series	Mimi Leder (for "The Healers")	Nominated	
Primetime Emmy Awards	1996	Outstanding Directing for a Drama Series	Christopher Chulack (for "Hell and High Water")	Nominated	
Primetime Emmy Awards	1996	Outstanding Writing for a Drama Series	John Wells (for "The Healers")	Nominated	
Primetime Emmy Awards	1996	Outstanding Writing for a Drama Series	Neal Baer (for "Hell and High Water")	Nominated	
Primetime Emmy Awards	1997	The President's Award		Nominated	
Primetime Emmy Awards	1997	Outstanding Drama Series	ER (Note: Nominees: Penny Adams, Neal Baer, Christopher Chulack, Michael Crichton, Carol Flint, Lance Gentile, Paul Manning, Wendy Spence Rosato, John Wells, Lydia Woodward)	Nominated	
Primetime Emmy Awards	1997	Outstanding Lead Actor in a Drama Series	Anthony Edwards (for "Tribes")	Nominated	
Primetime Emmy Awards	1997	Outstanding Lead Actress in a Drama Series	Sherry Stringfield (for "Fear of Flying")	Nominated	
Primetime Emmy Awards	1997	Outstanding Lead Actress in a Drama Series	Julianna Margulies (for "The Long Way Around")	Nominated	
Primetime Emmy Awards	1997	Outstanding Supporting Actor in a Drama Series	Noah Wyle	Nominated	
Primetime Emmy Awards	1997	Outstanding Supporting Actor in a Drama Series	Eriq La Salle	Nominated	
Primetime Emmy Awards	1997	Outstanding Supporting Actress in a Drama Series	Gloria Reuben	Nominated	
Primetime Emmy Awards	1997	Outstanding Supporting Actress in a Drama Series	CCH Pounder	Nominated	
Primetime Emmy Awards	1997	Outstanding Supporting Actress in a Drama Series	Laura Innes	Nominated	
Primetime Emmy Awards	1997	Outstanding Directing for a Drama Series	Tom Moore (for "Union Station")	Nominated	
Primetime Emmy Awards	1997	Outstanding Directing for a Drama Series	Christopher Chulack (for "Fear of Flying")	Nominated	
Primetime Emmy Awards	1997	Outstanding Directing for a Drama Series	Rod Holcomb (for "Last Call")	Nominated	
Primetime Emmy Awards	1997	Outstanding Writing for a Drama Series	John Wells (for "Faith")	Nominated	
Primetime Emmy Awards	1997	Outstanding Writing for a Drama Series	Neal Baer (for "Whose Appy Now?")	Nominated	
Primetime Emmy Awards	1998	Outstanding Drama Series	ER (Note: Nominees: Penny Adams, Neal Baer, Christopher Chulack, Michael Crichton, Carol Flint, Lance Gentile, Walon Green, David Mills, Jack Orman, Tom Park, Wendy Spence Rosato, John Wells, Lydia Woodward)	Nominated	
Primetime Emmy Awards	1998	Outstanding Lead Actor in a Drama Series	Anthony Edwards (for "Family Practice")	Nominated	
Primetime Emmy Awards	1998	Outstanding Lead Actress in a Drama Series	Julianna Margulies (for "Carter's Choice")	Nominated	
Primetime Emmy Awards	1998	Outstanding Supporting Actor in a Drama Series	Noah Wyle	Nominated	
Primetime Emmy Awards	1998	Outstanding Supporting Actor in a Drama Series	Eriq La Salle	Nominated	
Primetime Emmy Awards	1998	Outstanding Supporting Actress in a Drama Series	Gloria Reuben	Nominated	
Primetime Emmy Awards	1998	Outstanding Supporting Actress in a Drama Series	Laura Innes	Nominated	
Primetime Emmy Awards	1998	Outstanding Directing for a Drama Series	Thomas Schlamme (for "Ambush")	Nominated	
Primetime Emmy Awards	1999	Outstanding Drama Series	ER (Note: Nominees: Penny Adams, Neal Baer, Christopher Chulack, Michael Crichton, Carol Flint, Jonathan Kaplan, Jack Orman, Wendy Spence Rosato, John Wells, Lydia Woodward)	Nominated	
Primetime Emmy Awards	1999	Outstanding Lead Actress in a Drama Series	Julianna Margulies (for "The Storm (Parts I and II)")	Nominated	
Primetime Emmy Awards	1999	Outstanding Supporting Actor in a Drama Series	Noah Wyle	Nominated	
Primetime Emmy Awards	2000	Outstanding Drama Series	ER (Note: Nominees: Penny Adams, Neal Baer, Michael Crichton, R. Scott Gemmill, Patrick Harbinson, Jonathan Kaplan, Jack Orman, Wendy Spence Rosato, Richard Thorpe, John Wells, Lydia Woodward)	Nominated	
Primetime Emmy Awards	2000	Outstanding Lead Actress in a Drama Series	Julianna Margulies (for "Great Expectations")	Nominated	
Primetime Emmy Awards	2000	Outstanding Directing for a Drama Series	John Wells (for "Such Sweet Sorrow")	Nominated	
Primetime Emmy Awards	2000	Outstanding Directing for a Drama Series	Jonathan Kaplan (for "All in the Family")	Nominated	
Primetime Emmy Awards	2001	Outstanding Drama Series	ER (Note: Nominees: Neal Baer, Michael Crichton, R. Scott Gemmill, Dee Johnson, Jonathan Kaplan, Christopher Misiano, Jack Orman, Wendy Spence Rosato, Joe Sachs, Meredith Stiehm, Richard Thorpe, John Wells)	Nominated	
Primetime Emmy Awards	2001	Outstanding Supporting Actress in a Drama Series	Maura Tierney (for "Fear of Commitment" and "Where the Heart Is")	Nominated	
Primetime Emmy Awards	2001	Outstanding Directing for a Drama Series	Jonathan Kaplan (for "The Visit")	Nominated	
Primetime Emmy Awards	2002	Outstanding Writing for a Drama Series	John Wells (for "On the Beach")	Nominated	
Primetime Emmy Awards	2004	Outstanding Directing for a Drama Series	Christopher Chulack (for "The Lost")	Nominated	
Primetime Emmy Awards	2009	Outstanding Directing for a Drama Series	Rod Holcomb (for "And in the End...")	Won	
Primetime Creative Arts Emmy Awards	1995	Outstanding Guest Actor in a Drama Series	Alan Rosenberg (for "Into That Good Night")	Nominated	
Primetime Creative Arts Emmy Awards	1995	Outstanding Guest Actor in a Drama Series	Vondie Curtis-Hall (for "ER Confidential")	Nominated	
Primetime Creative Arts Emmy Awards	1995	Outstanding Guest Actress in a Drama Series	Rosemary Clooney (for "Going Home")	Nominated	
Primetime Creative Arts Emmy Awards	1995	Outstanding Guest Actress in a Drama Series	Colleen Flynn (for "Love's Labor Lost")	Nominated	
Primetime Creative Arts Emmy Awards	1995	Outstanding Individual Achievement in Casting	John Frank Levey, Barbara Miller	Won	
Primetime Creative Arts Emmy Awards	1995	Outstanding Individual Achievement in Editing for a Series – Single-Camera Production	Randy Jon Morgan (for "24 Hours")	Nominated	
Primetime Creative Arts Emmy Awards	1995	Outstanding Individual Achievement in Editing for a Series – Single-Camera Production	Randy Jon Morgan, Rick Tuber (for "Love's Labor Lost")	Won	
Primetime Creative Arts Emmy Awards	1995	Outstanding Individual Achievement in Graphic Design and Title Sequences	Billy Pittard, Suzanne Kiley	Won	
Primetime Creative Arts Emmy Awards	1995	Outstanding Individual Achievement in Main Title Theme Music	James Newton Howard	Nominated	
Primetime Creative Arts Emmy Awards	1995	Outstanding Individual Achievement in Makeup for a Series	Susan A. Cabral (for "24 Hours")	Nominated	
Primetime Creative Arts Emmy Awards	1995	Outstanding Individual Achievement in Sound Editing for a Series	James Bailey, Casey J. Crabtree, Susan Mick, Thomas A. Harris, Catherine Flynn, John F. Reynolds, Steven M. Sax, Rick Camara, John Voss Bonds Jr., Walter Newman (for "Love's Labor Lost")	Won	
Primetime Creative Arts Emmy Awards	1995	Outstanding Individual Achievement in Sound Mixing for a Drama Series	Allen L. Stone, Frank Jones, Michael E. Jiron, Russell C. Fager (for "Love's Labor Lost")	Won	
Primetime Creative Arts Emmy Awards	1996	Outstanding Guest Actress in a Drama Series	Penny Fuller (for "Welcome Back, Carter!")	Nominated	
Primetime Creative Arts Emmy Awards	1996	Outstanding Casting for a Series	John Frank Levey, Barbara Miller	Nominated	
Primetime Creative Arts Emmy Awards	1996	Outstanding Cinematography for a Series	Richard Thorpe (for "Hell and High Water")	Nominated	
Primetime Creative Arts Emmy Awards	1996	Outstanding Single-Camera Editing for a Series	Jacque Elaine Toberen (for "Hell and High Water")	Nominated	
Primetime Creative Arts Emmy Awards	1996	Outstanding Single-Camera Editing for a Series	Randy Jon Morgan (for "The Healers")	Nominated	
Primetime Creative Arts Emmy Awards	1996	Outstanding Sound Mixing for a Drama Series	Allen L. Stone, Frank Jones, Michael E. Jiron, Will Yarbrough (for "Hell and High Water")	Nominated	
Primetime Creative Arts Emmy Awards	1997	Outstanding Guest Actor in a Drama Series	William H. Macy	Nominated	
Primetime Creative Arts Emmy Awards	1997	Outstanding Guest Actor in a Drama Series	Ewan McGregor (for "The Long Way Around")	Nominated	
Primetime Creative Arts Emmy Awards	1997	Outstanding Guest Actress in a Drama Series	Veronica Cartwright (for "Whose Appy Now?" and "Faith")	Nominated	
Primetime Creative Arts Emmy Awards	1997	Outstanding Casting for a Series	John Frank Levey, Barbara Miller	Won	
Primetime Creative Arts Emmy Awards	1997	Outstanding Single-Camera Picture Editing for a Series	Kevin Casey (for "Union Station")	Nominated	
Primetime Creative Arts Emmy Awards	1997	Outstanding Single-Camera Picture Editing for a Series	Randy Jon Morgan (for "The Long Way Around")	Won	
Primetime Creative Arts Emmy Awards	1997	Outstanding Sound Mixing for a Drama Series	Allen L. Stone, Frank Jones, Michael E. Jiron, Lowell Harris (for "Fear of Flying")	Won	
Primetime Creative Arts Emmy Awards	1998	Outstanding Guest Actress in a Drama Series	Swoosie Kurtz (for "Suffer the Little Children")	Nominated	
Primetime Creative Arts Emmy Awards	1998	Outstanding Casting for a Series	John Frank Levey, Barbara Miller	Nominated	
Primetime Creative Arts Emmy Awards	1998	Outstanding Lighting Direction (Electronic) for a Drama Series, Variety Series, Miniseries, Movie or a Special	Richard Thorpe (for "Ambush")	Nominated	
Primetime Creative Arts Emmy Awards	1998	Outstanding Single-Camera Picture Editing for a Series	Kevin Casey (for "Exodus")	Nominated	
Primetime Creative Arts Emmy Awards	1998	Outstanding Sound Editing for a Series	James Bailey, Casey J. Crabtree, Michael Dittrick, Thomas A. Harris, Catherine Flynn, Darleen Stoker, Rick Camara, Darren Wright, Walter Newman (for "Exodus")	Won	
Primetime Creative Arts Emmy Awards	1998	Outstanding Sound Mixing for a Drama Series	Ed Greene, Peter Baird, Jon Cevtello, Lowell Harris (for "Ambush")	Nominated	
Primetime Creative Arts Emmy Awards	1998	Outstanding Sound Mixing for a Drama Series	Allen L. Stone, David Concors, Michael E. Jiron, Lowell Harris (for "Exodus")	Nominated	
Primetime Creative Arts Emmy Awards	1998	Outstanding Technical Direction/Camera/Video for a Series	Gene Crowe, David Chameides, Hank Geving, Larry Heider, Bob Highton, Don Lenzer, Bill Philbin, Chuck Reilly, John O'Brien (for "Ambush")	Won	
Primetime Creative Arts Emmy Awards	1999	Outstanding Single-Camera Picture Editing for a Series	Kevin Casey (for "The Storm (Part I)")	Nominated	
Primetime Creative Arts Emmy Awards	1999	Outstanding Sound Editing for a Series	James Bailey, Casey J. Crabtree, Sharyn M. Tylk, Rick Hromadka, Thomas A. Harris, Bruce M. Honda, Darleen Stoker, Rick Camara, Darren Wright, Walter Newman (for "The Storm (Part II)")	Won	
Primetime Creative Arts Emmy Awards	1999	Outstanding Sound Mixing for a Drama Series	Allen L. Stone, David Concors, Michael E. Jiron, Marc A. Gilmartin (for "The Storm (Part II)")	Won	
Primetime Creative Arts Emmy Awards	2000	Outstanding Guest Actor in a Drama Series	Alan Alda (for "Truth & Consequences")	Nominated	
Primetime Creative Arts Emmy Awards	2000	Outstanding Casting for a Drama Series	John Frank Levey, Barbara Miller	Nominated	
Primetime Creative Arts Emmy Awards	2000	Outstanding Single-Camera Picture Editing for a Series	Kevin Casey (for "All in the Family")	Won	
Primetime Creative Arts Emmy Awards	2000	Outstanding Sound Editing for a Series	Michael Crabtree, Casey J. Crabtree, Sharyn M. Tylk, Virginia Cook-McGowan, Darleen Stoker, Rick Camara, Darren Wright, Thomas A. Harris, John F. Reynolds, Walter Newman (for "All in the Family")	Nominated	
Primetime Creative Arts Emmy Awards	2000	Outstanding Sound Mixing for a Drama Series	Allen L. Stone, David Concors, Michael E. Jiron, Marc A. Gilmartin (for "All in the Family")	Nominated	
Primetime Creative Arts Emmy Awards	2001	Outstanding Guest Actor in a Drama Series	James Cromwell (for "A Walk in the Woods")	Nominated	
Primetime Creative Arts Emmy Awards	2001	Outstanding Guest Actress in a Drama Series	Sally Field	Won	
Primetime Creative Arts Emmy Awards	2001	Outstanding Single-Camera Sound Mixing for a Series	Allen L. Stone, David Concors, Michael E. Jiron, James Clark (for "The Crossing")	Nominated	
Primetime Creative Arts Emmy Awards	2001	Outstanding Sound Editing for a Series	Michael Crabtree, Casey J. Crabtree, Sharyn M. Tylk, Thomas A. Harris, Darleen Stoker, Lou Kleinman, Constance A. Kazmer, David Werntz, Rick Hromadka, Darren Wright, John F. Reynolds, Walter Newman (for "The Crossing")	Won	
Primetime Creative Arts Emmy Awards	2002	Outstanding Guest Actress in a Drama Series	Mary McDonnell	Nominated	
Primetime Creative Arts Emmy Awards	2002	Outstanding Single-Camera Sound Mixing for a Series	Mike Brooks, David Concors, Michael E. Jiron, James Clark (for "Partly Cloudy, Chance of Rain")	Won	
Primetime Creative Arts Emmy Awards	2002	Outstanding Sound Editing for a Series	Michael Crabtree, Casey J. Crabtree, Sharyn M. Tylk, Karyn Spangenberg, David Werntz, Rick Hromadka, Kenneth Young, Darren Wright, Virginia Cook-McGowan, Darleen Stoker, Thomas A. Harris, Walter Newman (for "Partly Cloudy, Chance of Rain")	Nominated	
Primetime Creative Arts Emmy Awards	2003	Outstanding Guest Actor in a Drama Series	Don Cheadle	Nominated	
Primetime Creative Arts Emmy Awards	2003	Outstanding Guest Actress in a Drama Series	Sally Field	Nominated	
Primetime Creative Arts Emmy Awards	2003	Outstanding Single-Camera Sound Mixing for a Series	Adam Sawelson, David Concors, Doug Davey, James Clark (for "Chaos Theory")	Won	
Primetime Creative Arts Emmy Awards	2003	Outstanding Sound Editing for a Series	Michael Crabtree, Casey J. Crabtree, Sharyn M. Tylk, David Werntz, Rick Hromadka, Kenneth Young, Darren Wright, Darleen Stoker, Thomas A. Harris, Walter Newman (for "Chaos Theory")	Nominated	
Primetime Creative Arts Emmy Awards	2004	Outstanding Guest Actor in a Drama Series	Bob Newhart	Nominated	
Primetime Creative Arts Emmy Awards	2004	Outstanding Single-Camera Picture Editing for a Drama Series	Kevin Casey (for "Freefall")	Nominated	
Primetime Creative Arts Emmy Awards	2004	Outstanding Sound Editing for a Series	Michael Crabtree, Casey J. Crabtree, Sharyn M. Tylk, Karyn Spangenberg, David Werntz, Constance A. Kazmer, Rick Hromadka, Kenneth Young, Darren Wright, Darleen Stoker, Thomas A. Harris, Walter Newman (for "Drive")	Nominated	
Primetime Creative Arts Emmy Awards	2005	Outstanding Guest Actor in a Drama Series	Ray Liotta (for "Time of Death")	Won	
Primetime Creative Arts Emmy Awards	2005	Outstanding Guest Actor in a Drama Series	Red Buttons (for "Ruby Redux")	Nominated	
Primetime Creative Arts Emmy Awards	2005	Outstanding Stunt Coordination	Cort Hessler (for "The Show Must Go On")	Nominated	
Primetime Creative Arts Emmy Awards	2006	Outstanding Guest Actor in a Drama Series	James Woods (for "Body & Soul")	Nominated	
Primetime Creative Arts Emmy Awards	2006	Outstanding Sound Editing for a Series	Michael Crabtree, Casey J. Crabtree, Sharyn M. Tylk, Bruce M. Honda, Kenneth Young, Rick Hromadka, Darren Wright, Darleen Stoker, Thomas A. Harris, Walter Newman (for "Two Ships")	Nominated	
Primetime Creative Arts Emmy Awards	2007	Outstanding Guest Actor in a Drama Series	Forest Whitaker (for "Murmers of the Heart")	Nominated	
Primetime Creative Arts Emmy Awards	2007	Outstanding Sound Editing for a Series	Michael Crabtree, Casey J. Crabtree, Sharyn M. Tylk, Adam Johnston, Kenneth Young, Karyn Foster, Darleen Stoker, Bob Redpath, Walter Newman (for "Bloodline")	Nominated	
Primetime Creative Arts Emmy Awards	2007	Outstanding Stunt Coordination	Gary Hymes (for "Bloodline")	Nominated	
Primetime Creative Arts Emmy Awards	2008	Outstanding Guest Actor in a Drama Series	Stanley Tucci (for "The War Comes Home")	Nominated	
Primetime Creative Arts Emmy Awards	2008	Outstanding Sound Editing for a Series	Michael Crabtree, Casey J. Crabtree, Sharyn M. Tylk, Adam Johnston, Kenneth Young, Bruce M. Honda, Darleen Stoker, Bob Redpath, Walter Newman (for "The War Comes Home")	Nominated	
Primetime Creative Arts Emmy Awards	2009	Outstanding Guest Actor in a Drama Series	Ernest Borgnine (for "And in the End…")	Nominated	
PRISM Awards	1998	TV Drama Series Episode	"When the Bough Breaks" (Note: Received PRISM Commendation)	Nominated	
PRISM Awards	1999	TV Prime Time Drama Series Episode	"My Brother's Keeper" (Note: Received PRISM Certificate of Merit)	Nominated	
PRISM Awards	1999	TV Prime Time Drama Series Continuing Storyline	Chase Carter ("Sharp Relief" / "Carter's Choice" / "My Brother's Keeper" / "A Bloody Mess" / "Of Past Regret and Future Fear")	Won	
PRISM Awards	1999	TV Prime Time Drama Series Continuing Storyline	Baby McNeil ("Of Past Regret and Future Fear" / "Suffer the Little Children" / "A Hole in the Heart")	Nominated	
PRISM Awards	2000	TV Prime Time Drama Series Episode	"Truth & Consequences"	Nominated	
PRISM Awards	2000	TV Prime Time Drama Series Continuing Storyline	Hathaway's Choice ("Sins of the Fathers" / "Truth & Consequences" / "The Peace of Wild Things" / "Humpty Dumpty")	Won	
PRISM Awards	2000	TV Prime Time Drama Series Continuing Storyline	How the Finch Stole Christmas ("Humpty Dumpty" / "How the Finch Stole Christmas")	Nominated	
PRISM Awards	2001	TV Drama Series Continuing Storyline	Carter's Addiction ("Be Still My Heart" / "All in the Family" / "Be Patient" / "Under Control" / "Match Made in Heaven" / "The Fastest Year" / "Such Sweet Sorrow" / "May Day" / "Homecoming" / "Sand and Water" / "Mars Attacks")	Won	
PRISM Awards	2002	TV Drama Series Episode	"Survival of the Fittest"	Nominated	
PRISM Awards	2002	TV Drama Series Episode	"Sailing Away"	Nominated	
PRISM Awards	2002	TV Drama Series Episode	"The Longer You Stay"	Nominated	
PRISM Awards	2002	TV Drama Series Episode	"Supplies and Demands"	Nominated	
PRISM Awards	2003	TV Drama Series Episode	"Damage is Done"	Nominated	
PRISM Awards	2003	TV Drama Series Episode	"First Snowfall"	Nominated	
PRISM Awards	2003	TV Drama Series Multi-Episode Storyline	Abby's Alcoholism ("Beyond Repair" / "Brothers and Sisters" / "The Letter" / "Chaos Theory" / "Insurrection" / "Walk Like A Man" / "Tell Me Where It Hurts")	Won	
PRISM Awards	2003	Performance in a Drama Series Episode	Alex Kingston	Nominated	
PRISM Awards	2003	Performance in a Drama Series Multi-Episode Storyline	Noah Wyle	Won	
PRISM Awards	2003	Performance in a Drama Series Multi-Episode Storyline	Maura Tierney	Nominated	
PRISM Awards	2004	TV Drama Series Episode	"Death and Taxes"	Nominated	
PRISM Awards	2005	TV Drama Series Episode	"Time of Death"	Won	
PRISM Awards	2005	TV Drama Series Multi-Episode Storyline	Carter Relapses ("Damaged" / "Fear")	Nominated	
PRISM Awards	2005	Performance in a Drama Series Episode	Ray Liotta	Won	
PRISM Awards	2007	Drama Series Episode	"Strange Bedfellows"	Nominated	
PRISM Awards	2007	Drama Series Episode	"Reason to Believe"	Won	
PRISM Awards	2007	Performance in a Drama Series Episode	Maura Tierney	Nominated	
PRISM Awards	2008	Drama Series Multi-Episode Storyline	"Gravity" / "Under the Influence" / "The Test" / "Blackout" / "Coming Home" / "Skye's the Limit" / "300 Patients"	Won	
PRISM Awards	2008	Performance in a Drama Series Multi-Episode Storyline	Maura Tierney	Nominated	
PRISM Awards	2010	Drama Series Episode – Substance Use	"And in the End..."	Nominated	
PRISM Awards	2010	Performance in a Drama Episode	John Stamos	Nominated	
Producers Guild of America Awards	1995	Outstanding Producer of Episodic Television	Michael Crichton, John Wells	Won	
Producers Guild of America Awards	2000	Vision Award	John Wells (Note: Shared with The West Wing and Third Watch)	Won	
Producers Guild of America Awards	2001	Outstanding Producer of Episodic Television, Drama		Nominated	
Q Awards	1995	Best Quality Drama Series	ER	Nominated	
Q Awards	1995	Best Actor in a Quality Drama Series	Anthony Edwards	Nominated	
Q Awards	1995	Best Actress in a Quality Drama Series	Sherry Stringfield	Nominated	
Q Awards	1995	Best Supporting Actor in a Quality Drama Series	Noah Wyle	Nominated	
Q Awards	1995	Best Supporting Actress in a Quality Drama Series	Julianna Margulies	Won	
Q Awards	1995	Specialty Player	Kathleen Wilhoite	Won	
Q Awards	1996	Best Actress in a Quality Drama Series	Sherry Stringfield	Won	
Q Awards	1996	Best Recurring Player	Kathleen Wilhoite	Nominated	
Q Awards	1997	Best Quality Drama Series	ER	Won	
Q Awards	1997	Best Actor in a Quality Drama Series	Anthony Edwards	Nominated	
Q Awards	1997	Best Actress in a Quality Drama Series	Julianna Margulies	Won	
Q Awards	1997	Best Supporting Actress in a Quality Drama Series	Gloria Reuben	Won	
Q Awards	1997	Best Supporting Actress in a Quality Drama Series	Laura Innes	Nominated	
Q Awards	1997	Best Supporting Actor in a Quality Drama Series	Noah Wyle	Won	
Q Awards	1997	Best Supporting Actor in a Quality Drama Series	Eriq La Salle	Nominated	
Q Awards	1997	Best Recurring Player	Michael Beach	Nominated	
Q Awards	1998	Best Quality Drama Series	ER	Nominated	
Q Awards	1998	Best Actress in a Quality Drama Series	Julianna Margulies	Nominated	
Q Awards	1998	Best Supporting Actress in a Quality Drama Series	Gloria Reuben	Won	
Q Awards	1998	Best Supporting Actress in a Quality Drama Series	Laura Innes	Nominated	
Q Awards	1998	Best Supporting Actor in a Quality Drama Series	Noah Wyle	Nominated	
Q Awards	1999	Best Actress in a Quality Drama Series	Julianna Margulies	Nominated	
Q Awards	1999	Best Supporting Actress in a Quality Drama Series	Laura Innes	Nominated	
Q Awards	2000	Best Actress in a Quality Drama Series	Julianna Margulies	Nominated	
Q Awards	2000	Best Supporting Actress in a Quality Drama Series	Laura Innes	Nominated	
Satellite Awards	1997	Best Television Series, Drama	ER	Nominated	
Satellite Awards	1997	Best Actor in a Series, Drama	Anthony Edwards	Nominated	
Satellite Awards	1997	Best Actress in a Series, Drama	Julianna Margulies	Nominated	
Satellite Awards	1998	Best Actress in a Series, Drama	Julianna Margulies	Nominated	
Satellite Awards	1999	Best Television Series, Drama	ER	Nominated	
Satellite Awards	1999	Best Actor in a Series, Drama	George Clooney	Nominated	
Satellite Awards	2003	Best Actress in a Series, Drama	Maura Tierney	Nominated	
Screen Actors Guild Awards	1995	Outstanding Performance by an Ensemble in a Drama Series	George Clooney, Anthony Edwards, Eriq La Salle, Julianna Margulies, Sherry Stringfield, Noah Wyle	Nominated	
Screen Actors Guild Awards	1996	Outstanding Performance by a Male Actor in a Drama Series	Anthony Edwards	Won	
Screen Actors Guild Awards	1996	Outstanding Performance by a Male Actor in a Drama Series	George Clooney	Nominated	
Screen Actors Guild Awards	1996	Outstanding Performance by a Female Actor in a Drama Series	Julianna Margulies	Nominated	
Screen Actors Guild Awards	1996	Outstanding Performance by an Ensemble in a Drama Series	George Clooney, Anthony Edwards, Eriq La Salle, Julianna Margulies, Gloria Reuben, Sherry Stringfield, Noah Wyle	Won	
Screen Actors Guild Awards	1997	Outstanding Performance by a Male Actor in a Drama Series	Anthony Edwards	Nominated	
Screen Actors Guild Awards	1997	Outstanding Performance by a Male Actor in a Drama Series	George Clooney	Nominated	
Screen Actors Guild Awards	1997	Outstanding Performance by an Ensemble in a Drama Series	George Clooney, Anthony Edwards, Laura Innes, Eriq La Salle, Julianna Margulies, Gloria Reuben, Sherry Stringfield, Noah Wyle	Won	
Screen Actors Guild Awards	1998	Outstanding Performance by a Male Actor in a Drama Series	Anthony Edwards	Won	
Screen Actors Guild Awards	1998	Outstanding Performance by a Female Actor in a Drama Series	Julianna Margulies	Won	
Screen Actors Guild Awards	1998	Outstanding Performance by an Ensemble in a Drama Series	Maria Bello, George Clooney, Anthony Edwards, Laura Innes, Alex Kingston, Eriq La Salle, Julianna Margulies, Gloria Reuben, Sherry Stringfield, Noah Wyle	Won	
Screen Actors Guild Awards	1999	Outstanding Performance by a Male Actor in a Drama Series	Anthony Edwards	Nominated	
Screen Actors Guild Awards	1999	Outstanding Performance by a Female Actor in a Drama Series	Julianna Margulies	Won	
Screen Actors Guild Awards	1999	Outstanding Performance by an Ensemble in a Drama Series	George Clooney, Anthony Edwards, Laura Innes, Alex Kingston, Eriq La Salle, Julianna Margulies, Kellie Martin, Gloria Reuben, Noah Wyle	Won	
Screen Actors Guild Awards	2000	Outstanding Performance by an Ensemble in a Drama Series	Anthony Edwards, Laura Innes, Alex Kingston, Eriq La Salle, Julianna Margulies, Kellie Martin, Paul McCrane, Michael Michele, Erik Palladino, Gloria Reuben, Goran Višnjić, Noah Wyle	Nominated	
Screen Actors Guild Awards	2001	Outstanding Performance by a Male Actor in a Drama Series	Anthony Edwards	Nominated	
Screen Actors Guild Awards	2001	Outstanding Performance by a Female Actor in a Drama Series	Sally Field	Nominated	
Screen Actors Guild Awards	2001	Outstanding Performance by an Ensemble in a Drama Series	Anthony Edwards, Laura Innes, Alex Kingston, Eriq La Salle, Julianna Margulies, Kellie Martin, Paul McCrane, Michael Michele, Ming-Na, Erik Palladino, Maura Tierney, Goran Višnjić, Noah Wyle	Nominated	
Shanghai Television Festival	1996	Best Supporting Actor	Eriq La Salle	Won	
TCA Awards	1995	Program of the Year	ER	Won	
TCA Awards	1995	Outstanding Achievement in Drama	ER	Nominated	
TCA Awards	1996	Program of the Year	ER	Nominated	
TCA Awards	1996	Outstanding Achievement in Drama	ER	Nominated	
TCA Awards	1997	Individual Achievement in Drama	Anthony Edwards	Nominated	
TCA Awards	1998	Outstanding Achievement in Drama	ER	Nominated	
TCA Awards	1998	Individual Achievement in Drama	Anthony Edwards	Nominated	
TCA Awards	2009	Heritage Award		Won	
Teen Choice Awards	1999	TV – Choice Drama	ER	Nominated	
Teen Choice Awards	1999	TV – Choice Actor	Noah Wyle	Nominated	
Teen Choice Awards	2004	Choice TV Actor – Drama/Action Adventure	Mekhi Phifer	Nominated	
Teen Choice Awards	2004	Choice Breakout TV Star – Female	Parminder Nagra	Nominated	
Telegatto	1996	Best Foreign TV Series	ER	Nominated	
Telegatto	1997	Best Foreign TV Series	ER	Won	
Telegatto	2002	Best TV Series	ER	Nominated	
Telegatto	2003	Best TV Series	ER	Nominated	
Telegatto	2004	Best TV Series	ER	Nominated	
TV Guide Awards	1999	Favorite Drama Series	ER	Won	
TV Guide Awards	1999	Favorite Actress in a Drama Series	Julianna Margulies	Nominated	
TV Guide Awards	2000	Favorite Drama Series	ER	Won	
TV Guide Awards	2000	Favorite Actress in a Drama Series	Julianna Margulies	Nominated	
TV Guide Awards	2001	Drama Series of the Year	ER	Nominated	
TV Guide Awards	2001	Actor of the Year in a Drama Series	Anthony Edwards	Nominated	
TV Guide Awards	2001	Supporting Actor of the Year in a Drama Series	Noah Wyle	Won	
TV Guide Awards	2001	Supporting Actress of the Year in a Drama Series	Maura Tierney	Nominated	
TV Guide Awards	2013	Favorite Classic TV	ER	Nominated	
TV Land Awards	2006	Most Memorable Kiss	George Clooney, Julianna Margulies	Nominated	
TV Land Awards	2009	Icon Award	Angela Bassett, Linda Cardellini, Ellen Crawford, Anthony Edwards, Yvette Freeman, Alex Kingston, Lily Mariye, Kellie Martin, Paul McCrane, Mekhi Phifer	Won	
Visual Effects Society Awards	2004	Outstanding Visual Effects in a Television Series	Sam Nicholson, Kyle J. Healey, Eric Grenaudier, Anthony Ocampo (for "Freefall")	Nominated	
Visual Effects Society Awards	2007	Outstanding Supporting Visual Effects in a Broadcast Program	Sam Nicholson, Scott Ramsey, Adam Ealovega, Anthony Ocampo (for "Scoop and Run")	Won	
Writers Guild of America Awards	1996	Television: Episodic Drama	Lance Gentile (for "Love's Labor Lost")	Won	
Writers Guild of America Awards	1998	Television: Episodic Drama	Neal Baer (for "Whose Appy Now?")	Nominated	
Writers Guild of America Awards	1999	Television: Episodic Drama	Walon Green, Joe Sachs (for "Exodus")	Nominated	
Writers Guild of America Awards	2000	Television: Episodic Drama	John Wells (for "The Storm (Part I)")	Nominated	
Writers Guild of America Awards	2003	Television: Episodic Drama	John Wells (for "On The Beach")	Nominated	
Young Artist Awards	1995	Best Performance by an Actress Under Ten in a TV Series	Yvonne Zima	Nominated	
Young Artist Awards	1995	Best Performance by a Youth Actress – TV Guest Star	Rachael Bella	Nominated	
Young Artist Awards	1996	Best Performance by a Young Actress – TV Drama Series	Yvonne Zima	Nominated	
Young Artist Awards	1997	Best Performance in a Drama Series – Guest Starring Young Actor	Austin O'Brien	Nominated	
Young Artist Awards	1997	Best Performance in a Drama Series – Guest Starring Young Actress	Kirsten Dunst	Nominated	
Young Artist Awards	1999	Best Performance in a TV Drama Series – Supporting Young Actor	Trevor Morgan	Nominated	
Young Artist Awards	2000	Best Performance in a TV Drama Series – Guest Starring Young Actress	Rachel Grate	Nominated	
Young Artist Awards	2002	Best Performance in a TV Drama Series – Guest Starring Young Actress	Hallee Hirsh	Nominated	
Young Artist Awards	2002	Best Performance in a TV Drama Series – Guest Starring Young Actress	Jamie Renée Smith	Won	
Young Artist Awards	2002	Best Performance in a TV Series (Comedy or Drama) – Young Actor Age 10 or Under	Myles Jeffrey	Nominated	
Young Artist Awards	2003	Best Performance in a TV Drama Series – Guest Starring Young Actress	Kay Panabaker	Nominated	
Young Artist Awards	2004	Best Performance in a Television Series – Recurring Young Actor	Oliver Davis	Won	
Young Artist Awards	2004	Best Performance in a Television Series – Guest Starring Young Actor	Alex Edwards	Nominated	
Young Artist Awards	2005	Best Performance in a Television Series – Recurring Young Actor	Oliver Davis	Nominated	
Young Artist Awards	2005	Best Performance in a TV Series (Comedy or Drama) – Young Actress Age Ten or Younger	Kali Majors	Nominated	
Young Artist Awards	2007	Best Performance in a TV Series (Comedy or Drama) – Recurring Young Actor	Masam Holden	Nominated	
Young Artist Awards	2008	Best Performance in a TV Series – Recurring Young Actor	Dominic Janes	Nominated	
Young Artist Awards	2008	Best Performance in a TV Series – Recurring Young Actress	Chloe Greenfield	Nominated	
Young Artist Awards	2009	Best Performance in a TV Series – Guest Starring Young Actor	Carlos Knight	Won (Note: Tied with Joey Luthman for Private Practice)	
Young Artist Awards	2010	Best Performance in a TV Series – Guest Starring Young Actress	Danielle Chuchran	Nominated	
YoungStar Awards	1997	Best Young Actress in a Drama TV Series	Kirsten Dunst	Nominated	
