= List of awards and nominations received by The Jeffersons =

This is the list with awards and nominations received by the American sitcom The Jeffersons (1975–1985).

== By award ==
=== Golden Globe Awards ===
Year	Category	Nominee(s)	Result	Ref.
1976	Best Actress in a Television Series – Musical or Comedy	Isabel Sanford	Nominated	
1977	Best Actress in a Television Series – Musical or Comedy	Isabel Sanford	Nominated	
1982	Best Actress in a Television Series – Musical or Comedy	Isabel Sanford	Nominated	
1983	Best Actress in a Television Series – Musical or Comedy	Isabel Sanford	Nominated	
1984	Best Television Series – Musical or Comedy		Nominated	
1984	Best Actor in a Television Series – Musical or Comedy	Sherman Hemsley	Nominated	
1984	Best Actress in a Television Series – Musical or Comedy	Isabel Sanford	Nominated	
1984	Best Actress in a Supporting Role in a Series, Miniseries or Motion Picture Made for Television	Marla Gibbs	Nominated	

=== Humanitas Prize ===
Year	Category	Nominee(s)	Result	Ref.
1978	30 Minute Network or Syndicated Television	Roger Shulman and John Baskin (for "984 W. 124th Street, Apt. 5C")	Nominated	

=== NAACP Image Awards ===
Year	Category	Nominee(s)	Result	Ref.
1981	Outstanding Actor in a Comedy Series or Special	Sherman Hemsley	Won	
1981	Outstanding Actress in a Comedy Series or Special	Marla Gibbs	Won	
1982	Outstanding Actor in a Comedy Series or Special	Sherman Hemsley	Won	
1982	Outstanding Actress in a Comedy Series or Special	Marla Gibbs	Won	

=== Online Film & Television Association Awards ===
Year	Category	Nominee(s)	Result	Ref.
1999	Television Hall of Fame: Productions	The Jeffersons	Inducted	
2021	Television Hall of Fame: Characters	George Jefferson	Inducted	
2021	Television Hall of Fame: Characters	Louise Jefferson	Inducted	
2021	Television Hall of Fame: Theme Songs	"Movin' On Up" – Jeff Barry and Ja'Net DuBois	Inducted	

=== Primetime Emmy Awards ===
Year	Category	Nominee(s)	Result	Ref.
1979	Outstanding Lead Actress in a Comedy Series	Isabel Sanford	Nominated	
1980	Outstanding Lead Actress in a Comedy Series	Isabel Sanford	Nominated	
1981	Outstanding Lead Actress in a Comedy Series	Isabel Sanford (for "And the Doorknobs Shined Like Diamonds")	Won	
1981	Outstanding Supporting Actress in a Comedy or Variety or Music Series	Marla Gibbs	Nominated	
1982	Outstanding Lead Actress in a Comedy Series	Isabel Sanford	Nominated	
1982	Outstanding Supporting Actress in a Comedy or Variety or Music Series	Marla Gibbs	Nominated	
1983	Outstanding Lead Actress in a Comedy Series	Isabel Sanford	Nominated	
1983	Outstanding Supporting Actress in a Comedy, Variety or Music Series	Marla Gibbs	Nominated	
1983	Outstanding Video Tape Editing for a Series	Larry Harris (for "Change of a Dollar")	Won	
1984	Outstanding Lead Actor in a Comedy Series	Sherman Hemsley	Nominated	
1984	Outstanding Lead Actress in a Comedy Series	Isabel Sanford	Nominated	
1984	Outstanding Supporting Actress in a Comedy Series	Marla Gibbs	Nominated	
1985	Outstanding Lead Actress in a Comedy Series	Isabel Sanford	Nominated	
1985	Outstanding Supporting Actress in a Comedy Series	Marla Gibbs	Nominated	

=== TV Land Awards ===
Year	Category	Nominee(s)	Result	Ref.
2003	Comedy Theme Song You Can't Get Out of Your Head	"Movin' On Up"	Nominated	
2003	Most Memorable Male Guest Star in a Comedy as Himself	Billy Dee Williams	Nominated	
2004	Favorite Cantankerous Couple	Sherman Hemsley and Isabel Sanford	Won	
2004	Favorite Made for TV Maid	Marla Gibbs	Nominated	
2004	Favorite "Big, Bad Momma"	Zara Cully	Nominated	
2005	Favorite Mother-In-Law	Zara Cully	Nominated	
2005	Favorite Nosy Neighbor	Paul Benedict	Nominated	
2006	Favorite Made-for-TV Maid	Marla Gibbs	Nominated	
2008	Neighbor You Try to Avoid	Paul Benedict	Nominated	

=== Writers Guild of America Awards ===
Year	Category	Nominee(s)	Result	Ref.
1977	Episodic Comedy	Michael S. Baser and Kim Weiskopf (for "Once a Friend")	Nominated	

=== Young Artist Awards ===
Year	Category	Nominee(s)	Result	Ref.
1984	Best Young Actor – Guest in a Television Series	Jaleel White	Nominated	
