= List of Humanitas Prize recipients =

The Humanitas Prize is a writing award for American television that was first given in 1975. In 1995, eligibility expanded to include the writers of feature films. Winners in bold.

Although the prize is awarded only to writers, this list includes only the title of the film or television show they wrote. Additionally, it does not cover all of the Humanitas Prize categories.

== 1970s ==
=== 1976 (1st Humanitas Awards) ===
Prizes were given out in 1975 on The Today Show.

30 Minute Network or Syndicated Television

- **Sunshine** ("The Angel of Doom") (NBC)
- Good Times ("The Lunch Money Rip-Off") (CBS)
- Good Times ("My Girl Henrietta") (CBS)

60 Minute Network or Syndicated Television

- **The Law** ("Complaint Amended") (NBC)
- The Cay (NBC)
- The Waltons ("The Romance") (CBS)

90 Minute or Longer Network or Syndicated Television

- **Larry** (CBS)
- ABC Theater, ("The Missiles of October") (ABC)
- NBC World Premiere Movie ("The Law") (NBC)

=== 1977 (2nd Humanitas Awards) ===
30 Minute Network or Syndicated Television

- **M*A*S*H** ("The Interview") (CBS)
- DOC ("Oldies But Goodies") (CBS)
- M*A*S*H ("Quo Vadis, Captain Chandler?") (CBS)

60 Minute Network or Syndicated Television

- **Family** ("Pilot") (ABC)
- Family ("A Right and Proper Goodbye") (ABC)
- The Waltons ("The Sermon") (CBS)

90 Minute or Longer Network or Syndicated Television

- **NBC World Premiere Movie** ("Farewell to Manzanar") (NBC)
- Medical Story ("The Quality of Mercy") (NBC)
- My Father's House (ABC)

=== 1978 (3rd Humanitas Awards) ===
30 Minute Network or Syndicated Television

- **The Mary Tyler Moore Show** ("Ted's Change of Heart") (CBS)
- All in the Family ("All in the Family, Part 2") (CBS)
- M*A*S*H ("Dear Sigmund") (CBS)

60 Minute Network or Syndicated Television

- **Roots** ("Part IV") (ABC)
- Roots ("Part III") (ABC)
- The Waltons ("The Pony Cart") (CBS)

90 Minute or Longer Network or Syndicated Television

- **Green Eyes** (ABC)
- Roots ("Part VIII") (ABC)
- Something for Joey (NBC)

Special Award

- **CBS Reports** ("The Fire Next Door") (CBS)

=== 1979 (4th Humanitas Awards) ===
30 Minute Network or Syndicated Television

- **All in the Family** ("The Brother") (CBS)
- Barney Miller ("Goodbye, Mr. Fish: Part 2") (ABC)
- The Jeffersons ("984 W. 124th St., Apt. 5C") (CBS)

60 Minute Network or Syndicated Television

- **Family** ("Annie Laurie") (ABC)
- Family ("The Princess in the Tower") (ABC)
- Hallmark Hall of Fame ("Taxi!!!") (NBC)

90 Minute or Longer Network or Syndicated Television

- **Special Olympics** (CBS)
- Breaking Up (ABC)
- The Other Side of Hell (NBC)

Special Award

- **CBS Reports** ("The Aliens") (CBS)

== 1980s ==
=== 1980 (5th Humanitas Awards) ===
30 Minute Network or Syndicated Television

- **Taxi** ("Blind Date") (ABC)
- All in the Family ("Edith Gets Fired") (CBS)
- M*A*S*H ("Point of View") (CBS)

60 Minute Network or Syndicated Television

- **Lou Grant** ("Vet") (CBS)
- Hallmark Hall of Fame ("Stubby Pringle's Christmas") (NBC)
- Lou Grant ("Dying") (CBS)

90 Minute or Longer Network or Syndicated Television

- **Summer of My German Soldier** (NBC)
- Friendly Fire (ABC)
- Like Normal People (ABC)

Special Award

- **Who Are the DeBolts? And Where Did They Get Nineteen Kids?** (ABC)

=== 1981 (6th Humanitas Awards) ===
30 Minute Network or Syndicated Television

- **M*A*S*H** ("Dreams") (CBS)
- United States ("Uncle Charlie") (NBC)
- WKRP in Cincinnati ("God Talks to Johnny") (CBS)

60 Minute Network or Syndicated Television

- **Family** ("Thanksgiving") (ABC)
- The Waltons ("The Remembrance") (CBS)
- The White Shadow ("The Death of Me Yet") (CBS)

90 Minute or Longer Network or Syndicated Television

- **Son-Rise: A Miracle of Love** (NBC)
- '**The Family Man'** (CBS)
- The Gift (CBS)

Special Award

- **NBC White Paper** ("We're Moving Up! The Hispanic Migration") (NBC)

=== 1982 (7th Humanitas Awards) ===
30 Minute Network or Syndicated Television

- **WKRP in Cincinnati** ("Venus Flytrap Explains") (CBS)
- Archie Bunker's Place ("Tough Love") (CBS)
- M*A*S*H ("Blood Brothers") (CBS)

60 Minute Network or Syndicated Television

- **Hill Street Blues** ("Dressed to Kill") (NBC)
- Lou Grant ("Streets") (CBS)
- The White Shadow ("Reunion (Part 2)") (CBS)

90 Minute or Longer Network or Syndicated Television

- **The Shadow Box** (ABC)
- Leave 'Em Laughing (CBS)
- A Matter of Life and Death (CBS)

Special Award

- **NBC Reports** ("The Migrants, 1980") (NBC)

=== 1983 (8th Humanitas Awards) ===
30 Minute Network or Syndicated Television

- **M*A*S*H** ("Where There's a Will, There's a War") (CBS)
- Archie Bunker's Place ("Relapse") (CBS)
- One Day at a Time ("Mrs. O'Leary's Kid") (CBS)

60 Minute Network or Syndicated Television

- **Lou Grant** ("Hunger") (CBS)
- ABC Afterschool Special ("The Wave") (ABC)
- Hill Street Blues ("The World According to Freedom") (NBC)

90 Minute or Longer Network or Syndicated Television

- **Divorce Wars: A Love Story** (ABC)
- Bitter Harvest (NBC)
- The Marva Collins Story (CBS)

Special Award

- **America Works When America Works** (NBC)

=== 1984 (9th Humanitas Awards) ===
30 Minute Network or Syndicated Television

- **M*A*S*H** ("Who Knew?") (CBS)
- Diff'rent Strokes ("Bicycle Man, Part 2") (NBC)
- It Takes Two ("Death Penalty") (ABC)

60 Minute Network or Syndicated Television

- **Hill Street Blues** ("Trial By Fury") (NBC)
- Fame ("Solo Song") (NBC)
- St. Elsewhere ("Rain") (NBC)

90 Minute or Longer Network or Syndicated Television

- **Special Bulletin** (NBC)
- Benny's Place (ABC)
- Two of a Kind (CBS)

=== 1985 (10th Humanitas Awards) ===
30 Minute Network or Syndicated Television

- **Family Ties** ("Not An Affair to Remember") (NBC)
- Family Ties ("Say Uncle") (NBC)
- Gimme a Break! ("Herbie") (NBC)

60 Minute Network or Syndicated Television

- **Hill Street Blues** ("Doris in Wonderland") (NBC)
- St. Elsewhere ("All About Eve") (NBC)
- St. Elsewhere ("Ties That Bind") (NBC)

90 Minute or Longer Network or Syndicated Television

- **Choices of the Heart** (NBC)
- Memorial Day (CBS)
- Something About Amelia (ABC)

=== 1986 (11th Humanitas Awards) ===
30 Minute Network or Syndicated Television

- **The Cosby Show** ("Theo & the Joint") (NBC)
- Family Ties ("Hotline Fever") (NBC)
- Family Ties ("Remembrance of Things Past, Part 2") (NBC)

60 Minute Network or Syndicated Television

- **St. Elsewhere** ("Bye, George") (NBC)
- Cagney & Lacey ("An Unusual Occurrence") (CBS)
- Hill Street Blues ("Watt a Way to Go") (NBC)

90 Minute or Longer Network or Syndicated Television

- **The Dollmaker** (ABC)
- Not My Kid (CBS)
- Surviving (ABC)

Children's Animation Television

- **Jim Henson's Muppet Babies** ("Eight Take Away One Equals Panic") (CBS)
- CBS Storybreak ("Zucchini") (CBS)

Children's Live Action Television

- **CBS Schoolbreak Special** ("The Day the Senior Class Got Married") (CBS)
- CBS Schoolbreak Special ("Contract for Life: The S.A.D.D. Story") (CBS)
- Pryor's Place ("Home Free") (CBS)

Special Award

- **NBC White Paper** ("Vietnam, Lessons of a Lost War") (NBC)

=== 1987 (12th Humanitas Awards) ===
30 Minute Network or Syndicated Television

- **The Cosby Show** ("Denise's Friend") (NBC)
- The Cosby Show ("An Early Spring") (NBC)
- The Cosby Show ("Truth or Consequences") (NBC)
- Mr. Sunshine ("Pilot") (CBS)

60 Minute Network or Syndicated Television

- **Cagney & Lacey** ("Ordinary Hero") (CBS)
- Moonlighting ("Every Daughter's Father is a Virgin") (ABC)
- St. Elsewhere ("Sanctuary") (NBC)

90 Minute or Longer Network or Syndicated Television

- **Do You Remember Love** (CBS)
- Hallmark Hall of Fame ("Love Is Never Silent") (CBS)
- Love, Mary (CBS)

Children's Live Action Television

- **ABC Afterschool Special** ("No Greater Gift") (ABC)
- ABC Afterschool Special ("Don't Touch") (ABC)
- CBS Schoolbreak Special ("Have You Tried Talking to Patty?") (CBS)

Special Award

- **CBS Reports** ("The Vanishing Family: Crisis in Black America") (CBS)

=== 1988 (13th Humanitas Awards) ===
30 Minute Network or Syndicated Television

- **Kate & Allie** ("Jennie & Jason") (CBS)
- The Cosby Show ("The March") (NBC)
- Family Ties ("My Back Pages") (NBC)

60 Minute Network or Syndicated Television

- **Family Ties** ("A, My Name is Alex"") (special two-part episode) (NBC)
- St. Elsewhere ("A Room With A View") (NBC)
- St. Elsewhere ("Where There's Hope, There's Crosby") (NBC)

90 Minute or Longer Network or Syndicated Television

- **Hallmark Hall of Fame** ("Promise") (CBS)
- Alex: The Life of a Child (ABC)
- Miles To Go... (CBS)

Children's Animation Television

- **The Smurfs** ("The Lure of the Orb") (NBC)
- The Berenstain Bears ("Forget Their Manners") (CBS)
- Galaxy High School ("The Brain Blaster") (CBS)

Children's Live Action Television

- **CBS Schoolbreak Special** ("The Day They Came To Arrest the Book") (CBS)
- ABC Afterschool Special ("Teen Father") (ABC)
- CBS Schoolbreak Special ("What If I'm Gay?") (CBS)

Special Award

- **Mainstreet** (NBC)

=== 1989 (14th Humanitas Awards) ===
30 Minute Network or Syndicated Television

- **Frank's Place** ("The Bridge") (CBS)
- Kate & Allie ("Brother, Can You Spare a Dime?") (CBS)
- The Wonder Years ("Pilot") (ABC)

60 Minute Network or Syndicated Television

- **thirtysomething** ("Business As Usual") (ABC)
- Cagney & Lacey ("Don't I Know You") (CBS)
- Cagney & Lacey ("Turn, Turn, Turn: Part 2") (CBS)

90 Minute or Longer Network or Syndicated Television

- **A Gathering of Old Men** (CBS)
- Proud Men (ABC)

Children's Animation Television

- **The Flintstone Kids** ("Rocky's Rocky Road") (ABC)
- Jim Henson's Muppet Babies ("My Muppet Valentine") (CBS)
- Little Clowns of Happytown ("Goodbye Grandma") (ABC)

Children's Live Action Television

- **ABC Afterschool Special** ("The Kid Who Wouldn't Quit: The Brad Silverman Story") (ABC)
- ABC Afterschool Special ("Just a Regular Kid: An AIDS Story") (ABC)
- CBS Schoolbreak Special ("Never Say Goodbye") (CBS)

Special Award

- **ABC News Closeup** ("They Have Souls Too") (ABC)

== 1990s ==
=== 1990 (15th Humanitas Awards) ===
30 Minute Network or Syndicated Television

- **The Wonder Years** ("Pottery Will Get You Nowhere") (ABC)
- Baby Boom ("Guilt") (NBC)

60 Minute Network or Syndicated Television

- **China Beach** ("Promised Land") (ABC)
- China Beach ("Lost and Found, Part 2") (ABC)
- thirtysomething ("Elliot's Dad") (ABC)
- thirtysomething ("In Re: The Marriage of Weston") (ABC)

90 Minute or Longer Network or Syndicated Television

- **God Bless the Child** (ABC)

Children's Animation Television

- **The New Adventures of Winnie the Pooh** ("Find Her, Keep Her") (ABC)
- The Adventures of Raggedy Ann and Andy ("The Little Chicken Adventure") (CBS)
- The Chipmunks ("A Special Kind of Champion") (NBC)

Children's Live Action Television

- **CBS Schoolbreak Special** ("My Past Is My Own") (CBS)
- ABC Afterschool Special ("Date Rape") (ABC)
- ABC Afterschool Special ("Taking a Stand") (ABC)

Special Award

- **Destined to Live** (NBC)

=== 1991 (16th Humanitas Awards) ===
30 Minute Network or Syndicated Television

- **The Wonder Years** ("Square Dance") (ABC)
- Why, Charlie Brown, Why? (CBS)
- The Wonder Years ("The Powers That Be") (ABC)

60 Minute Network or Syndicated Television

- **thirtysomething** ("The Other Shoe") (ABC)
- China Beach ("Dear China Beach") (ABC)
- China Beach ("How to Stay Alive in Vietnam Part 2") (ABC)

90 Minute or Longer Network or Syndicated Television

- **Common Ground** (CBS)
- Hallmark Hall of Fame ("My Name Is Bill W.") (CBS)
- No Place Like Home (CBS)

Children's Animation Television

- **Dink, the Little Dinosaur** ("Badge of Courage") (CBS)
- Dink, the Little Dinosaur ("Crusty's Baby") (CBS)
- Jim Henson's Muppet Babies ("Romancing the Weirdo") (CBS)

Children's Live Action Television

- **ABC Afterschool Special** ("A Town's Revenge") (ABC)
- CBS Schoolbreak Special ("American Eyes") (CBS)
- CBS Schoolbreak Special ("The Frog Girl: The Jenifer Graham Story") (CBS)

Special Award

- **Raising Good Kids in Bad Times** ("See Dick and Jane Lie, Cheat and Steal: Teaching Morality to Kids") (NBC)

=== 1992 (17th Humanitas Awards) ===
30 Minute Network or Syndicated Television

- **The Wonder Years** ("Good-bye") (ABC)
- Doogie Howser, M.D. ("To Live and Die in Brentwood") (ABC)
- The Wonder Years ("The Ties That Bind") (ABC)

60 Minute Network or Syndicated Television

- **thirtysomething** ("Second Look") (ABC)
- China Beach ("One Small Step") (ABC)
- thirtysomething ("Fighting the Cold") (ABC)

90 Minute or Longer Network or Syndicated Television

- **Lucky Day** (ABC)
- Extreme Close-Up (NBC)
- Separate but Equal ("Parts I and II") (ABC)

Children's Animation Television

- **Camp Candy** ("Wish Upon a Fish") (NBC)
- Madeline's Christmas (The Family Channel)
- The Adventures of Super Mario Bros. 3 ("True Colors") (NBC)

Children's Live Action Television

- **CBS Schoolbreak Special** ("Abby, My Love") (CBS)
- CBS Schoolbreak Special ("Lies of the Heart") (CBS)
- CBS Schoolbreak Special ("Malcolm Takes a Shot") (CBS)

PBS/Cable Television

- **American Playhouse** ("Three Hotels") (PBS)
- Sudie and Simpson (Lifetime)

Special Awards

- **The Civil War** (PBS)
- **Over the Influence: Preventing Our Kids From Using Drugs and Alcohol** (SYN)

=== 1993 (18th Humanitas Awards) ===
30 Minute Network or Syndicated Television

- **Brooklyn Bridge** ("Boys of Summer") (CBS)
- Captain Planet and the Planeteers ("The Ark") (TBS)
- A Different World ("Mammy Dearest") (NBC)
- Roseanne ("This Old House") (ABC)
- The Wonder Years ("Hardware Store") (ABC)

60 Minute Network or Syndicated Television

- **I'll Fly Away** ("Amazing Grace") (NBC)
- Brooklyn Bridge ("When Irish Eyes Are Smiling") (CBS)
- I'll Fly Away ("Coming Home") (NBC)

90 Minute or Longer Network or Syndicated Television

- **I'll Fly Away** ("Pilot") (NBC)
- Broken Cord (ABC)
- China Beach ("Hello Goodbye") (ABC)

Children's Animation Television

- **The New Adventures of Winnie the Pooh** ("Home is Where the Home Is") (ABC)
- Winnie the Pooh and Christmas Too (ABC)

Children's Live Action Television

- **CBS Schoolbreak Special** ("Dedicated to the One I Love") (CBS)
- CBS Schoolbreak Special ("Different Worlds: A Story of Interracial Love") (CBS)
- Saved by the Bell ("Home for Christmas, Part 2") (NBC)

PBS/Cable Television

- **Wildflower** (Lifetime)
- American Playhouse ("Darrow") (PBS)
- Mark Twain and Me (Disney Channel)

=== 1994 (19th Humanitas Awards) ===
30 Minute Network or Syndicated Television

- **Roseanne** ("Terms of Estrangement, Part 2") (ABC)
- Roseanne ("Wait 'Til Your Father Gets Home") (ABC)
- The Wonder Years ("Nose") (ABC)

60 Minute Network or Syndicated Television

- **I'll Fly Away** ("Comfort and Joy") (NBC)
- Life Goes On ("Bedfellows") (ABC)
- TriBeCa ("The Box") (FOX)

90 Minute or Longer Network or Syndicated Television

- **Hallmark Hall of Fame** ("Miss Rose White") (NBC)
- For Their Own Good (ABC)
- Jonathan: The Boy Nobody Wanted (NBC)

Children's Animation Television

- **The Legend of Prince Valiant** ("The Flute") (The Family Channel)
- The Little Mermaid ("Eel-Ectric City") (CBS)
- The Little Mermaid ("Message in a Bottle") (CBS)

Children's Live Action Television

- **CBS Schoolbreak Special** ("Big Boys Don't Cry") (CBS)
- ABC Weekend Specials ("The Parsley Garden") (ABC)
- WonderWorks ("You Must Remember This") (PBS)

PBS/Cable Television

- **Cooperstown** (TBS)
- American Experience ("Simple Justice") (PBS)
- American Playhouse ("Mrs. Cage") (PBS)

Special Award

- **Scared Silent: Exposing and Ending Child Abuse** (SYN)

=== 1995 (20th Humanitas Awards) ===
30 Minute Network or Syndicated Television

- **Murphy Brown** ("Reaper Madness") (CBS)
- Edith Ann: A Few Pieces of the Puzzle (ABC)
- Frasier ("The Good Son") (NBC)
- The John Larroquette Show ("Amends") (NBC)

60 Minute Network or Syndicated Television

- **NYPD Blue** ("Personal Foul") (ABC)
- Law & Order ("Sanctuary") (NBC)
- Picket Fences ("Abominable Snowman") (CBS)

90 Minute or Longer Network or Syndicated Television

- **David's Mother** (CBS)
- Out of Darkness (ABC)
- There Are No Children Here (ABC)

Children's Animation Television

- **American Heroes and Legends** ("Johnny Appleseed") (Showtime)
- Madeline ("Madeline and the 40 Thieves") (The Family Channel)
- Madeline ("Madeline and the Missing Clown") (The Family Channel)

Children's Live Action Television

- **CBS Schoolbreak Special** ("Love in the Dark Ages") (CBS)
- ABC Afterschool Special ("Montana Crossroads") (ABC)
- CBS Schoolbreak Special ("If I Die Before I Wake") (CBS)

PBS/Cable Television

- **And the Band Played On** (HBO)
- State of Emergency (HBO)
- Strapped (HBO)

Feature Film

- **Schindler's List**
- In the Name of the Father
- Searching For Bobby Fischer
- Shadowlands

=== 1996 (21st Humanitas Awards) ===
30 Minute Network or Syndicated Television

- **The John Larroquette Show** ("Faith") (NBC)
- Blossom ("The Date") (NBC)
- Grace Under Fire ("Grace Under Water") (ABC)
- Roseanne ("White Men Can't Kiss") (ABC)

60 Minute Network or Syndicated Television

- **Party of Five** ("Thanksgiving") (FOX)
- **Picket Fences** ("Final Judgment") (CBS)
- Chicago Hope ("Shutt Down") (CBS)

90 Minute or Longer Network or Syndicated Television

- **Hallmark Hall of Fame** ("A Place for Annie") (ABC)
- Heart of a Child (NBC)
- The Other Woman (CBS)

Children's Animation Television

- **Whitewash** (HBO)
- Rugrats ("I Remember Melville") (Nickelodeon)
- ABC Weekend Specials ("The Secret Garden") (ABC)

Children's Live Action Television

- **CBS Schoolbreak Special** ("Between Mother and Daughter") (CBS)
- ABC Afterschool Special ("Boys Will Be Boys") (ABC)
- Adventures in Wonderland ("The Sound and the Furry") (The Disney Channel)

PBS/Cable Television

- **The Burning Season** (HBO)
- Lakota Woman: Siege at Wounded Knee (TNT)
- On Promised Land (The Disney Channel)

Feature Film

- **The Shawshank Redemption**
- Forrest Gump
- Nobody's Fool

Special Award

- **What Can We Do About Violence?** (PBS)

=== 1997 (22nd Humanitas Awards) ===
30 Minute Network or Syndicated Television

- **Frasier** ("Breaking the Ice") (NBC)
- Grace Under Fire ("No Help Wanted") (ABC)
- Home Improvement ("The Longest Day") (ABC)

60 Minute Network or Syndicated Television

- **Picket Fences** ("Saint Zack") (CBS)
- ER ("The Healers") (NBC)
- Homicide: Life on the Street ("A Doll's Eyes") (NBC)
- Party of Five ("Before & After") (FOX)

90 Minute or Longer Network or Syndicated Television

- **Gulliver's Travels** (NBC)
- Hallmark Hall of Fame ("The Boys Next Door") (CBS)
- Hallmark Hall of Fame ("Journey") (CBS)

Children's Animation Television

- **Life with Louie** ("Raindrops Keep Falling On My Bed") (FOX)
- The New Adventures of Madeline ("Madeline and the Treasure Hunt") (ABC)
- Santo Bugito ("The Carnivore Kid") (CBS)

Children's Live Action Television

- **ABC Afterschool Special** ("Fast Forward") (ABC)
- ABC Afterschool Special ("Educating Mom") (ABC)
- ABC Weekend Special ("The Secret of Lizard Woman") (ABC)

PBS/Cable Television

- **Hiroshima** (Showtime)
- Andersonville ("Part II") (TNT)
- A Mother's Prayer (USA)

Feature Film

- **Dead Man Walking**
- Babe
- A Family Thing

=== 1998 (23rd Humanitas Awards) ===
30 Minute Network or Syndicated Television

- **Something So Right** ("Something About An Older Guy") (NBC)
- Grace Under Fire ("Pills") (ABC)
- Roseanne ("The Miracle") (ABC)

60 Minute Network or Syndicated Television

- **NYPD Blue** ("Taillight's Last Gleaming") (ABC)
- Chicago Hope ("The Parent Rap") (CBS)
- Chicago Hope ("A Time to Kill") (CBS)

90 Minute or Longer Network or Syndicated Television

- **Hallmark Hall of Fame** ("Old Man") (CBS)
- ...First Do No Harm (ABC)
- Hallmark Hall of Fame ("The Summer of Ben Tyler") (CBS)

Children's Animation Television

- **Life with Louie** ("The Thank You Note") (FOX)
- Little Bear ("Little Bear's Surprise") (Nickelodeon)
- Timon and Pumbaa ("Once Upon a Timon") (CBS)

Children's Live Action Television

- **Lifestories: Families in Crisis** ("Someone Had To Be Benny") (HBO)
- Sesame Street ("Miles' Family Reunion") (PBS)
- Shari's Passover Surprise (PBS)

PBS/Cable Television

- **Miss Evers' Boys** (HBO)
- Crime of the Century (HBO)
- The Twilight of the Golds (Showtime)

Feature Film

- **Secrets & Lies**
- Jerry Maguire
- Shine

=== 1999 (24th Humanitas Awards) ===
30 Minute Network or Syndicated Television

- **Murphy Brown** ("Turpis Capillis Annus (Bad Hair Year)") (CBS)
- Foto-Novelas ("The Fix") (PBS)
- Frasier ("The Kid") (NBC)

60 Minute Network or Syndicated Television

- **Nothing Sacred** ("Proofs for the Existence of God") (ABC)
- ER ("Family Practice") (NBC)
- Homicide: Life on the Street ("Mercy") (NBC)

90 Minute or Longer Network or Syndicated Television

- **Wonderful World of Disney** ("Ruby Bridges") (ABC)
- NYPD Blue ("Lost Israel: Part 2") (ABC)
- The Staircase (CBS)

Children's Animation Television

- **Life with Louie** ("Blinded By Love") (FOX)
- Life with Louie ("Family Portrait") (FOX)
- Rugrats ("Mother's Day") (Nickelodeon)

Children's Live Action Television

- **Smudge** (TNT)
- Saved by the Bell: The New Class ("Putting Up Walls") (NBC)
- Shaquille O'Neal's Sports Theater ("First Time") (Nickelodeon)

PBS/Cable Television

- **George Wallace** ("Part II") (TNT)
- Clover (USA)
- Mother Teresa: In the Name of God's Poor (The Family Channel)

Feature Film

- **Good Will Hunting** (Matt Damon and Ben Affleck)
- Contact
- The Education of Little Tree

== 2000s ==
=== 2000 (25th Humanitas Awards) ===
30 Minute Network or Syndicated Television

- **Sports Night** ("The Six Southern Gentlemen of Tennessee") (ABC)
- Everybody Loves Raymond ("Frank's Tribute") (CBS)
- Sports Night ("The Quality of Mercy at 29K") (ABC)

60 Minute Network or Syndicated Television

- **Homicide: Life on the Street** ("Shades of Gray") (NBC)
- JAG ("Angels 30") (CBS)
- NYPD Blue ("Raging Bulls") (ABC)
- Rescuers: Stories of Courage ("Aart and Johtje Vos") (Showtime)

90 Minute or Longer Network or Syndicated Television

- **NYPD Blue** ("Hearts and Souls") (ABC)
- Mama Flora's Family ("Part II") (CBS)
- Selma, Lord, Selma (ABC)

Children's Animation Television

- **Rugrats** ("Hand Me Downs") (Nickelodeon)
- Pocket Dragon Adventures ("Festival of Lights") (SYN)
- Rugrats ("Autumn Leaves") (Nickelodeon)

Children's Live Action Television

- **The Artists' Specials** ("Degas and the Dancer") (HBO)
- City Guys ("Gift of Friendship") (NBC)

PBS/Cable Television

- **Thanks of a Grateful Nation** (Showtime)
- Passing Glory (TNT)
- Thicker Than Blood (TNT)

Feature Film

- **October Sky**
- A Civil Action
- Saving Private Ryan

=== 2001 (26th Humanitas Awards) ===
30 Minute Network or Syndicated Television

- **Frasier** ("Something About Dr. Mary") (NBC)
- 3rd Rock from the Sun ("Dick, Who's Coming To Dinner") (NBC)
- Smart Guy ("Never Too Young") (The WB)

60 Minute Network or Syndicated Television

- **The West Wing** ("Take This Sabbath Day") (NBC)
- Once and Again ("Strangers and Brothers") (ABC)
- The West Wing ("In Excelsis Deo") (NBC)

90 Minute or Longer Network or Syndicated Television

- **Tuesdays with Morrie** (ABC)
- Anya's Bell (CBS)
- Joan of Arc ("Part II") (CBS)

Children's Animation Television

- **Happily Ever After: Fairy Tales for Every Child** ("The Sissy Duckling") (HBO)
- Recess ("A Science Fair to Remember") (ABC)
- Mythic Warriors ("Cadmus & Europa") (CBS)

Children's Live Action Television

- **The Color of Friendship** (Disney Channel)
- Caitlin's Way ("Stray") (Nickelodeon)
- Johnny Tsunami (Disney Channel)

PBS/Cable Television

- **A Lesson Before Dying** (HBO)
- Dash and Lilly (A&E)
- Freedom Song (TNT)

Feature Film

- **The Insider**
- The End of the Affair
- The Straight Story

Sundance Feature Film

- **Love and Basketball**
- The Big Kahuna
- What's Cooking?

=== 2002 (27th Humanitas Awards) ===
30 Minute Network or Syndicated Television

- **Everybody Loves Raymond** ("Ray's Journal") (CBS)
- Frasier ("Something About Dr. Mary") (NBC)
- Malcolm in the Middle ("Traffic Ticket") (FOX)

60 Minute Network or Syndicated Television

- **Once and Again** ("Food for Thought") (ABC)
- ER ("A Walk in the Woods") (NBC)
- Gideon's Crossing ("The Lottery") (ABC)
- Third Watch ("After Hours") (NBC)

90 Minute or Longer Network or Syndicated Television

- **Haven** ("Part II") (CBS)
- Jesus ("Part II") (CBS)
- Jewel (CBS)

Children's Animation Television

- **Clifford the Big Red Dog** ("A New Friend") (PBS)
- Madeline ("Madeline and the Giants") (Disney Channel)
- Rocket Power ("Radical New Equipment") (Nickelodeon)

Children's Live Action Television

- **Miracle in Lane 2** (Disney Channel)
- The Famous Jett Jackson ("Lost and Found") (Disney Channel)
- The Sandy Bottom Orchestra (Showtime)

PBS/Cable Television

- **Wit** (HBO)
- Boycott (HBO)
- What Makes a Family (Lifetime)

Feature Film

- **You Can Count on Me**
- Billy Elliot
- Traffic

Sundance Feature Film

- **Green Dragon**
- The Believer
- Dancing in September

=== 2003 (28th Humanitas Awards) ===
30 Minute Network or Syndicated Television

- **Scrubs** ("My Old Lady") (NBC)
- State of Grace ("Looking for God in All the Right Places") (FOX Family)
- State of Grace ("Love, Love, Me Do") (FOX Family)

60 Minute Network or Syndicated Television

- **The Practice** ("Honor Code") (ABC)
- **The West Wing** ("Two Cathedrals") (NBC)
- Band of Brothers ("Bastogne") (HBO)

90 Minute or Longer Network or Syndicated Television

- **Anne Frank: The Whole Story** (ABC)
- Crossed Over (CBS)
- The Rosa Parks Story (CBS)

Children's Animation Television

- **Balto II: Wolf Quest**
- Arthur ("The Boy With His Head in the Clouds") (PBS)
- Harold and the Purple Crayon ("Harold's Birthday Gift") (HBO)

Children's Live Action Television

- **My Louisiana Sky** (Showtime)
- The Brothers Garcia ("The Student Buddy") (Nickelodeon)

PBS/Cable Television

- **The Laramie Project** (HBO)
- Sins of the Father (FX)
- Within These Walls (Lifetime)

Feature Film

- **Iris**
- A Beautiful Mind
- I Am Sam

Sundance Feature Film

- **Real Women Have Curves**
- Australian Rules
- Her Majesty

=== 2004 (29th Humanitas Awards) ===
30 Minute Network or Syndicated Television

- **The Bernie Mac Show** ("Sweet Home Chicago Part 2") (FOX)
- The Bernie Mac Show ("Sweet Home Chicago Part 1") (FOX)
- Frasier ("Rooms With A View") (NBC)

60 Minute Network or Syndicated Television

- **The Practice** ("Final Judgment") (ABC)
- Boomtown ("Fearless") (NBC)
- ER ("On the Beach") (NBC)
- Without a Trace ("In Extremis") (CBS)

90 Minute or Longer Network or Syndicated Television

- **Our America** (Showtime)
- Door To Door (TNT)
- Path to War (HBO)

Children's Animation Television

- **Static Shock** ("Jimmy") (The WB)
- Liberty's Kids ("Common Sense") (PBS)
- Liberty's Kids ("Liberty or Death") (PBS)

Children's Live Action Television

- **A Ring of Endless Light** (Disney Channel)
- Maniac Magee (Nickelodeon)
- You Wish! (Disney Channel)

Feature Film

- **Antwone Fisher**
- About a Boy
- The Pianist

Sundance Feature Film

- **Whale Rider**
- In America
- Pieces of April
- Raising Victor Vargas

=== 2005 (30th Humanitas Awards) ===
30 Minute Network or Syndicated Television

- **The Bernie Mac Show** ("Saving Sergeant Tompkins") (FOX)
- The Bernie Mac Show ("Eye of the Tiger") (FOX)
- Scrubs ("My Screwup") (NBC)

60 Minute Network or Syndicated Television

- **Joan of Arcadia** ("Pilot") (CBS)
- ER ("On the Beach") (NBC)
- Joan of Arcadia ("The Uncertainty Principle") (CBS)

90 Minute or Longer Network or Syndicated Television

- **Angels In America** (HBO)
- Iron Jawed Angels (HBO)
- Jasper, Texas (Showtime)

Children's Animation Television

- **Little Bill** ("I Can Sign/The Sign for Friend") (Nickelodeon)
- Arthur ("Big Horns George") (PBS)
- Little Bill ("A Ramp for Monty") (Nickelodeon)

Children's Live Action Television

- **Crown Heights** (Showtime)
- Full-Court Miracle (Disney Channel)
- Going to the Mat (Disney Channel)

Feature Film

- **Dirty Pretty Things**
- Finding Nemo
- Seabiscuit

Sundance Feature Film

- **Mean Creek**
- Garden State
- The Woodsman

=== 2006 (31st Humanitas Awards) ===
60 Minute Network or Syndicated Television

- **The West Wing** ("NSF Thurmont") (NBC)
- ER ("Alone in a Crowd") (NBC)
- House ("Damned If You Do") (FOX)
- House ("Everybody Lies") (FOX)

90 Minute or Longer Network or Syndicated Television

- **Lackawanna Blues** (HBO)
- Ike: Countdown to D-Day (A&E)
- Saving Milly (CBS)

Children's Animation Television

- **Jakers! The Adventures of Piggley Winks** ("Waking Thor") (PBS)
- PAZ ("Things Change") (Discovery Kids/TLC)
- Toddworld ("Who's Your Best Friend?") (Discovery Kids/TLC)

Children's Live Action Television

- **Searching for David's Heart** (ABC Family)
- Buffalo Dreams (Disney Channel)
- Carry Me Home (Showtime)

Feature Film

- **Hotel Rwanda**
- Finding Neverland
- Millions

Sundance Feature Film

- **The Motel**
- Love, Ludlow
- Swimmers

=== 2007 (32nd Humanitas Awards) ===
30 Minute Network or Syndicated Television

- **My Name Is Earl** ("Pilot") (NBC)
- George Lopez ("The Kidney Stays In The Picture") (ABC)
- Scrubs ("My Way Home") (NBC)

60 Minute Network or Syndicated Television

- **House** ("Three Stories") (FOX)
- ER ("Darfur") (NBC)
- Law & Order: Special Victims Unit ("Ripped") (NBC)

90 Minute or Longer Network or Syndicated Television

- **The Girl in the Café** (HBO)
- The Colt (Hallmark)
- Warm Springs (HBO)

Children's Animation Television

- **Miss Spider's Sunny Patch Friends** ("A Froggy Day In Sunny Patch") (Nickelodeon)
- Maya & Miguel ("Miguel's Wonderful Life") (PBS)
- ToddWorld ("Benny's Missing Chew Toy") (TLC)

Children's Live Action Television

- **Edge of America** (Showtime)
- Felicity: An American Girl Adventure (The WB)
- High School Musical (Disney Channel)

Feature Film

- **Crash**
- The Chronicles of Narnia: The Lion, the Witch and the Wardrobe
- Glory Road

Sundance Feature Film

- **Quinceanera**
- Punching at the Sun
- Wristcutters: A Love Story

=== 2008 (33rd Humanitas Awards) ===
30 Minute Network or Syndicated Television

- **The New Adventures of Old Christine** ("Oh God, Yes") (CBS)
- Scrubs ("My Fallen Idol") (NBC)
- The War at Home ("Kenny Doesn't Live Here Anymore") (FOX)

60 Minute Network or Syndicated Television

- **ER** ("There Are No Angels Here") (NBC)
- House ("House vs. God") (FOX)
- The West Wing ("Election Day Part 2") (NBC)

90 Minute or Longer Network or Syndicated Television

- **Longford** (HBO)
- Tsunami: The Aftermath ("Part II") (HBO)
- Why I Wore Lipstick to My Mastectomy (Lifetime)

Children's Animation Television

- **Jakers! The Adventures of Piggley Winks** ("The Gift") (PBS)
- Maya & Miguel ("Give Me A Little Sign") (PBS)
- Miss Spider's Sunny Patch Friends ("The Prince, The Princess And The Bee") (Nickelodeon)

Children's Live Action Television

- **Molly: An American Girl on the Home Front** (Disney Channel)
- Jump In! (Disney Channel)

Feature Film

- **Freedom Writers**
- **Venus**
- Amazing Grace

Sundance Feature Film

- **Where God Left His Shoes**
- Ezra
- Waitress

=== 2009 (34th Humanitas Awards) ===
30 Minute Network or Syndicated Television

- **Scrubs** ("My Long Goodbye") (NBC)
- The Bill Engvall Show ("Aloha, Raffles") (TBS)
- In Treatment ("Sophie: Week Two") (HBO)

60 Minute Network or Syndicated Television

- **John Adams** ("Join or Die") (HBO)
- Boston Legal ("Roe V. Wade: The Musical") (ABC)
- The Wire ("Late Editions") (HBO)

90 Minute or Longer Network or Syndicated Television

- **Bury My Heart At Wounded Knee** (HBO)
- Charlie & Me (Hallmark)
- Hallmark Hall of Fame ("Pictures of Hollis Woods") (CBS)
- A Life Interrupted (Lifetime)

Children's Animation Television

- **My Friends Tigger & Pooh** ("Eeyore's Sad Day") (Disney Channel)
- Sweet Blackberry Presents ("The Journey of Henry Box Brown") (HBO)
- ToddWorld ("Come Out Of Your Shell") (TLC)

Children's Live Action Television

- **Johnny Kapahala: Back on Board** (Disney Channel)
- Minutemen (Disney Channel)
- Sheira & Loli's Dittydoodle Works ("Sacrifice") (WLIW)

Feature Film

- **The Diving Bell and the Butterfly**
- **Lars and the Real Girl**
- Juno

Sundance Feature Film

- **A Raisin in the Sun**
- Henry Poole Is Here
- The Visitor

== 2010s ==
=== 2010 (35th Humanitas Awards) ===
30 Minute Network or Syndicated Television

- **Scrubs** ("My Last Words") (ABC)
- 30 Rock ("Believe in the Stars") (NBC)
- How I Met Your Mother ("Happily Ever After") (CBS)
- The Simpsons ("All About Lisa") (FOX)

60 Minute Network or Syndicated Television

- **Friday Night Lights** ("Tomorrow Blues") (NBC)
- ER ("Heal Thyself") (NBC)
- House ("Unfaithful") (FOX)
- Law & Order: Special Victims Unit ("Swing") (NBC)

90 Minute or Longer Network or Syndicated Television

- **Taking Chance** (HBO)
- Gifted Hands: The Ben Carson Story (TNT)
- Pedro (MTV)

Children's Live Action Television

- **South of Nowhere** ("Spencer's 18th Birthday") (The N)
- True Jackson, VP ("The Rival") (Nickelodeon)
- True Jackson, VP ("Pilot") (Nickelodeon)

Feature Film

- **WALL-E**
- Doubt
- Milk
- The Secret Life of Bees
- Slumdog Millionaire

Sundance Feature Film

- **Amreeka**
- The Anarchist's Wife
- The Greatest

=== 2011 (36th Humanitas Awards) ===
30 Minute Network or Syndicated Television

- **Modern Family** ("Pilot") (ABC)
- **Nurse Jackie** ("Pilot") (Showtime)
- Meet the Browns ("Meet The Racist") (TBS)
- The Middle ("The Block Party") (ABC)
- The Simpsons ("The Greatest Story Ever D'ohed") (FOX)

60 Minute Network or Syndicated Television

- **Glee** ("Wheels") (FOX)
- **The Good Wife** ("Pilot") (CBS)
- Breaking Bad ("Peekaboo") (AMC)
- Grey's Anatomy ("Give Peace a Chance") (ABC)
- In Treatment ("Walter: Week Six") (HBO)
- Men of a Certain Age ("Father's Fraternity") (TNT)

90 Minute or Longer Network or Syndicated Television

- **Temple Grandin** (HBO)
- Amish Grace (Lifetime)
- Endgame (PBS)

Documentary Award

- **A Small Act** (HBO)
- Freedom Riders (PBS)
- Waste Land

Feature Film

- **Precious**
- The Hurt Locker
- The Little Traitor
- The Messenger

Sundance Feature Film

- **Winter's Bone**
- The Kids Are All Right
- Night Catches Us

=== 2012 (37th Humanitas Awards) ===
30 Minute Network or Syndicated Television

- **Modern Family** ("The Kiss") (ABC)
- The Big C ("Taking The Plunge") (Showtime)
- How I Met Your Mother ("Last Words") (CBS)
- Nurse Jackie ("Monkey Bits") (Showtime)

60 Minute Network or Syndicated Television

- **Friday Night Lights** ("Always") (NBC)
- Drop Dead Diva ("Good Grief") (Lifetime)
- House ("Help Me") (FOX)
- The Pacific ("Home") (HBO)

90 Minute or Longer Network or Syndicated Television

- **Thurgood** (HBO)
- Reviving Ophelia (Lifetime)
- Taken From Me: The Tiffany Rubin Story (Lifetime)

Children's Animation Television

- **Kung Fu Panda Holiday Special** (NBC)

Documentary Award

- **Louder Than a Bomb**
- Being Elmo: A Puppeteer's Journey
- Neshoba

Feature Film

- **The King's Speech**
- 127 Hours
- The Fighter

Sundance Feature Film

- **Win Win**
- Gun Hill Road
- Meek's Cutoff

=== 2013 (38th Humanitas Awards) ===
30 Minute Network or Syndicated Television

- **Modern Family** ("Aunt Mommy") (ABC)
- The Big C ("A Little Death") (Showtime)
- The Middle ("The Map") (ABC)

60 Minute Network or Syndicated Television

- **Grey's Anatomy** ("White Wedding") (ABC)
- **Rescue Me** ("Ashes") (FX)
- Blue Bloods ("The Job") (HBO)
- Parenthood ("Remember Me? I'm The One Who Loves You") (NBC)

90 Minute or Longer Network or Syndicated Television

- **Cinema Verite** (HBO)
- Hallmark Hall of Fame ("Beyond the Blackboard") (CBS)
- Hallmark Hall of Fame ("Have a Little Faith") (ABC)

Children's Animation Television

- **Pound Puppies** ("I Never Barked For My Father") (The Hub)

Children's Live Action Television

- **Radio Rebel** (Disney Channel)

Documentary Award

- **I Am**
- **Serving Life** (OWN)
- Buck
- Crime After Crime

Feature Film

- **The Conspirator**
- The Descendants
- Hugo
- Shame

Sundance Feature Film

- **Beasts of the Southern Wild**
- LUV
- Middle of Nowhere

=== 2014 (39th Humanitas Awards) ===
30 Minute Network or Syndicated Television

- **Modern Family** ("Party Crasher") (ABC)
- The New Normal ("The Godparent Trap") (NBC)
- Nurse Jackie ("Disneyland Sucks") (Showtime)

60 Minute Network or Syndicated Television

- **Bones** ("The Patriot In Purgatory") (FOX)
- House ("Everybody Dies") (FOX)
- Monday Mornings ("Truth Or Consequences") (TNT)

90 Minute or Longer Network or Syndicated Television

- **Hallmark Hall of Fame** ("Firelight") (ABC)
- Abducted: The Carlina White Story (Lifetime)
- Betty and Coretta (Lifetime)

Children's Live Action Television

- **Let It Shine** (Disney Channel)

Documentary Award

- **Ethel**
- Mea Maxima Culpa: Silence in the House of God (HBO)
- Project Nim

Feature Film

- **Silver Linings Playbook**
- Django Unchained
- Flight

Sundance Feature Film

- **Fruitvale Station**
- The Inevitable Defeat of Mister & Pete
- Mud

=== 2015 (40th Humanitas Awards) ===
30 Minute Network or Syndicated Television

- **Modern Family** ("Under Pressure") (ABC)
- How I Met Your Mother ("Last Forever" Part 2) (CBS)
- The Middle ("Happy Halloween IV: The Ghost Story") (ABC)

60 Minute Network or Syndicated Television

- **Homeland** ("The Star") (Showtime)
- Parenthood ("The Pontiac") (NBC)
- The Killing ("Six Minutes") (AMC)
- True Detective ("Form and Void") (HBO)

90 Minute or Longer Network or Syndicated Television

- **The Normal Heart** (HBO)
- Mary And Martha (HBO)
- Ring Of Fire (Lifetime)

Documentary Award

- **The Case Against 8**
- Finding Vivian Maier
- Merchants Of Doubt

Feature Film

- **12 Years A Slave**
- Belle
- Nebraska

Sundance Feature Film

- **Whiplash**
- Hellion
- Love Is Strange
- Camp X-Ray

=== 2016 (41st Humanitas Awards) ===
30 Minute Network or Syndicated Television

- **The Middle** ("The Graduate") (ABC)
- Blackish ("Please Don't Ask, Please Don't Tell") (ABC)
- Unbreakable Kimmy Schmidt ("Kimmy Goes Outside!") (Netflix)

60 Minute Network or Syndicated Television

- **Orange Is the New Black** ("Trust No Bitch") (Netflix)
- Madam Secretary ("Face the Nation") (CBS)
- The Affair ("Pilot") (Showtime)

Children's Animation Television

- **Arthur** ("The Tardy Tumbler") (PBS)

Children's Live Action Television

- **Gortimer Gibbon's Life on Normal Street** ("Gortimer and the Surprise Signature") (Amazon)
- Gortimer Gibbon's Life on Normal Street ("Ranger and the Legend of Pendragon's Gavel") (Amazon)
- Liv and Maddie ("Rate-A-Rooney") (Disney Channel)

Documentary Award

- **Landfill Harmonic**
- Citizenfour
- Southern Rites

Feature Film

- **Still Alice**
- Testament of Youth
- The Good Lie

Sundance Feature Film

- **Me and Earl and the Dying Girl**
- Dope
- Experimenter

=== 2017 (42nd Humanitas Awards) ===
30 Minute Network or Syndicated Television

- **Black-ish** ("Hope") (ABC)
- The Real O'Neals ("The Real Grandma") (ABC)
- Grace and Frankie ("The Party") (Netflix)

60 Minute Network or Syndicated Television

- **This Is Us** ("Pilot") (NBC)
- The Night Of ("The Call of the Wild") (HBO)
- Madam Secretary ("Waiting For Taleju") (CBS)

Children's Animation Television

- **Sofia the First** ("Dads and Daughters Day") (Disney Junior)
- Nina's World ("Nina's Brother for a Day") (Universal Kids)
- The Lion Guard ("Never Judge a Hyena by its Spots") (Disney Channel)

Children's Live Action

- **An American Girl Story – Melody 1963: Love Has to Win** (TV movie) (Amazon Studios)
- Degrassi: Next Class (""#TurntUp"") (Family Channel)
- Girl Meets World ("Girl Meets the Forgiveness Project") (Disney Channel)

Documentary Award

- **13th** (shared)
- **Jim: The James Foley Story** (shared)
- 120 Days

Feature Film

- **Hidden Figures** (shared)
- **Hacksaw Ridge** (shared)
- Arrival

Sundance Feature Film

- **The Birth of a Nation**
- First Girl I Loved
- The Fundamentals of Caring
- Tallulah

=== 2018 (43rd Humanitas Awards) ===
For the 2018 awards, feature films were separated into three categories.

30 Minute Network or Syndicated Television

- **The Big Bang Theory** ("The Long Distance Dissonance") (CBS)
- Black-ish ("Lemons") (ABC)
- Will & Grace ("Grandpa Jack") (NBC)

60 Minute Network or Syndicated Television

- **The Good Doctor** ("Burnt Food") (ABC)
- Game of Thrones ("The Dragon and the Wolf") (HBO)
- Madam Secretary ("Good Bones") (CBS)

Children's Animation

- **Doc McStuffins** ("Hannah the Brave") (Disney Junior)
- Sofia the First ("The Crown of Blossoms") (Disney Channel)
- Splash and Bubbles (PBS Kids)

Children's Live Action

- **Degrassi: Next Class** ("#ImSleep") (Family Channel / Netflix)
- An American Girl Story – Ivy & Julie 1976: A Happy Balance (TV movie)
- Sesame Street ("The Magical Wand Chase: A Sesame Street Special") (PBS / HBO)

Documentary Award

- **Cries from Syria**
- One of Us
- Human Flow
- Hearing Is Believing

Feature Film, Drama

- **Mudbound** (shared)
- **The Post** (shared)
- Three Billboards Outside Ebbing, Missouri

Feature Film, Comedy

- **Lady Bird**
- The Big Sick
- The Meyerowitz Stories (New and Selected)

Feature Film, Family

- **Ferdinand**
- Coco
- The Breadwinner

Sundance Feature Film

- **Crown Heights**
- Gook
- Novitiate

=== 2019 (44th Humanitas Awards) ===
Nominees were announced on 27 November 2018, and the prizes were awarded in 2019.

30-Minute Comedy

- **Dear White People** ("Volume 2, Chapter VIII") (Netflix) (shared)
- **The Marvelous Mrs. Maisel** ("Mid-way to Mid-town") (Amazon Prime) (shared)
- One Day at a Time ("Hello, Penelope") (Netflix)
- The Good Place ("Jeremy Bearimy") (Netflix)

60-Minute Drama

- **God Friended Me** ("Pilot") (CBS)
- Orange Is the New Black ("Be Free") (Netflix)
- The Good Doctor ("More") (ABC)
- This is Us (“This Big, Amazing, Beautiful Life”) (NBC)

Children's Teleplay

- **Alexa & Katie** ("Winter Formal, Part 2") (Netflix)
- My Little Pony: Friendship Is Magic ("Surf and/or Turf") (Discovery Family)
- Muppet Babies (“You Say Potato, I Say Best Friend”) (Disney Junior)
- Z-O-M-B-I-E-S (Disney Channel)

Documentary Award

- **Stolen Daughters: Kidnapped by Boko Haram**
- TransMilitary
- The Fourth Estate, "Part 3: American Carnage"
- The Price of Free

Feature Film, Drama

- **On the Basis of Sex**
- Black Panther
- Boy Erased
- What They Had

Feature Film, Comedy

- **Love, Simon**
- Boundaries
- Crazy Rich Asians
- Eighth Grade

Feature Film, Family

- **Mary Poppins Returns**
- Christopher Robin
- Incredibles 2
- Isle of Dogs

Independent Feature Film

- **Brian Banks**
- Laugh or Die
- Sorry to Bother You
- The Grizzlies
- The Rider

== 2020s ==
=== 2020 (45th Humanitas Awards) ===
Nominees were announced on 15 November 2019. For the first time, there were awards for "Limited Series, TV Movie or Special" and "Short Film". The awards were presented 24 January 2020 at The Beverly Hilton.

Comedy Teleplay

- **Veep ("South Carolina")** (HBO)
- Shrill ("Annie") (Hulu)
- Black-ish ("Black Like Us") (ABC)
- Atypical ("Road Rage Paige") (Netflix)

Drama Teleplay

- **The Handmaid's Tale ("Useful")** (Hulu)
- This Is Us ("Our Little Island Girl") (NBC)
- POSE ("In My Heels") (FX)
- The Twilight Zone ("Replay") (CBS All Access)

Children's Teleplay

- **Elena of Avalor (“Changing of the Guard”)** (Disney Junior)
- The Loud House ("Racing Hearts") (Nickelodeon)
- A Series of Unfortunate Events ("Penultimate Peril: Part 1") (Netflix)
- Niko and the Sword of Light ("The Automatron") (Amazon Video)

Limited Series, TV Movie or Special

- **When They See Us ("Part 4")** (Netflix)
- True Detective ("Now Am Found") (HBO)
- Chernobyl ("Vichnaya Pamyat") (HBO / Sky UK)
- Live in Front of a Studio Audience: Norman Lear's All in the Family and The Jeffersons (ABC)

Documentary

- **This Is Football ("Redemption")**
- Torn Apart: Separated at the Border
- Ernie & Joe: Crisis Cops
- Sea of Shadows

Feature Film, Drama

- **A Beautiful Day in the Neighborhood**
- A Hidden Life
- Dark Waters
- Bombshell

Feature Film, Comedy or Musical

- **Jojo Rabbit**
- The Farewell
- Yesterday
- The Laundromat

Feature Film, Family

- **Frozen II**
- The Peanut Butter Falcon
- Toy Story 4
- Klaus

Independent Feature Film

- **End of Sentence**
- Hotel Mumbai
- Brittany Runs a Marathon
- Clemency

Short Film

- **Kitbull**
- Variables
- Purl
- They Charge for the Sun

=== 2022 (46th Humanitas Awards) ===
Winners were announced on 9 September 2022 at an event held at the Beverly Hilton Hotel hosted by comedian Larry Wilmore. For the first time, an award was presented in Web Series. Prize winners are in bold.

Comedy Teleplay

- **black-ish ("If a Black Man Cries in the Woods...")** (ABC)
- Abbott Elementary ("Pilot") (ABC)
- Somebody Somewhere ("BFD") (HBO)
- The Conners ("Triggered") (ABC)

Drama Teleplay

- **Pachinko ("Chapter One")** (Apple TV+)
- Chicago P.D. ("Burnside") (NBC)
- Queen Sugar ("May 27, 2020") (OWN)
- Swagger ("Radicals") (Apple TV+)
- This is Us ("The Challenger") (NBC)

Children's Teleplay

- **El Deafo** (Apple TV+)
- Karma's World ("Hair Comes Trouble") (Netflix)
- Snoopy Presents: To Mom (and Dad), With Love (Apple TV+)
- The Babysitters Club ("Claudia and the Sad Goodbye") (Netflix)

Limited Series, TV Movie or Special

- **Women of the Movement ("Mother and Son")** (ABC / Hulu)
- Love Life ("Mia Hines") (HBO)
- Maid ("Snaps") (Netflix)
- Three Months (Paramount+)

Documentary

- **In the Same Breath**
- End of the Line: The Women of Standing Rock
- Frederick Douglass: In Five Speeches
- Through Our Eyes: 'Shelter'

Feature Film, Drama

- **The Starling**
- A Hero
- CODA
- Nine Days

Feature Film, Comedy

- **Don't Look Up**
- Everything Everywhere All at Once
- Queen Bees
- Tick, Tick... Boom!

Feature Film, Family

- **Encanto**
- 8-Bit Christmas
- Cinderella
- Spin

Short Film

- **Girls Are Strong Here**
- Far from the Tree
- Leap
- Nona

Web Series

- **The Disappointments**

=== 2023 (47th Humanitas Awards) ===
Winners were announced on 15 August 2023. Prize winners are in bold.

Comedy Teleplay

- **The Marvelous Mrs. Maisel ("Four Minutes")** (Prime Video)
- Atlanta ("The Goof Who Sat by the Door") (FX)
- Reservation Dogs ("Mabel") (FX / Hulu)
- Abbott Elementary ("Read-A-Thon") (ABC)

Drama Teleplay

- **The Last of Us ("Long, Long Time")** (HBO)
- Better Call Saul ("Saul Gone") (AMC)
- A Million Little Things ("One Big Thing") (ABC)
- All Creatures Great and Small ("Surviving Siegfried") (Channel 5 / PBS)

Children's Teleplay

- **Life by Ella ("Prison or Palace")** (Apple TV+)
- Pinecone & Pony ("A Life of Adventure") (Apple TV+)
- The Crossover ("X’s and 0’s") (Disney+)
- Moon Girl and Devil Dinosaur ("Hair Today Gone Tomorrow") (Disney Channel)

Limited Series, TV Movie or Special

- **A Small Light ("Pilot")** (National Geographic)
- Little America ("Paper Piano") (Apple TV+)
- Little America ("Camel on a Stick") (Apple TV+)
- An Amish Sin (Lifetime)

Documentary

- **Last Flight Home**
- The Human Trial
- Murder in Big Horn ("Episode 1") (Showtime)
- Hold Your Fire

Feature Film, Drama

- **A Jazzman's Blues**
- She Said
- Till

Feature Film, Comedy

- **Cha Cha Real Smooth**
- The Greatest Beer Run Ever
- Champions
- Dealing with Dad

Feature Film, Family

- **Guillermo del Toro's Pinocchio**
- Puss in Boots: The Last Wish
- Gigi & Nate

Short Film

- **Sevap / Mitzvah**
- Other Homes
- LOOK BACK AT IT
- Ninety-five Senses

=== 2024 (48th Humanitas Awards) ===
Winners were announced on 12 September 2024. Prize winners are in bold.

Drama Teleplay

- **Black Cake ("Nine Night")** (Hulu)
- The Crown ("Ritz") (Netflix)
- The Morning Show ("White Noise") (Apple TV+)
- Station 19 ("With So Little To Be Sure Of") (ABC)

Comedy Teleplay

- **Hacks ("Yes, And")** (Max)
- Act Your Age ("Snip Snip") (Bounce TV)
- Girls5eva ("Bomont") (Netflix)
- The Simpsons ("Night of the Living Wage") (FOX)

Limited Series Teleplay

- **Fellow Travelers ("Your Nuts Roasting on an Open Fire")** (Showtime)
- All the Light We Cannot See ("Episode 1") (Netflix)
- The Sympathizer ("Endings Are Hard, Aren't They?") (HBO)
- We Were the Lucky Ones ("Rio") (Hulu)

Children's Teleplay

- **Marvel's Moon Girl and Devil Dinosaur ("Ride or Die")** (Disney Channel)
- Heartstopper ("Perfect") (Apple TV+)
- What If...? ("What If... Hela Found the Ten Rings?") (Disney+)
- Snoopy Presents: Welcome Home, Franklin (Apple TV+)

Drama Feature

- **Origin**
- All of Us Strangers
- Suncoast
- Society of the Snow

Comedy Feature

- **Jules**
- American Fiction
- Flora and Son
- The Holdovers

Documentary

- **The Cowboy and the Queen**
- Sexual Healing
- El Equipo: The Story of the Argentine Forensic Anthropology Team

Family Feature

- **Nimona**
- Elemental
- Frybread Face and Me
- A Million Miles Away

Short Film

- **The Ballad of Tita and the Machines**
- Astonishing Little Feet
- Jelly
- The Rebel Girls

=== 2026 (50th Humanitas Awards) ===
Winners were announced on 9 September 2026. Prize winners are in bold.

Drama Teleplay

- **Paradise ("Graceland")** (Hulu)
- Chicago Med ("The Book of Charles") (NBC)
- Grey's Anatomy ("Sometimes I Feel Like A Motherless Child") (ABC)
- The Testaments ("Stadium") (Hulu)

Comedy Teleplay

- **Shrinking ("My Bad")** (Apple TV+)
- Abbott Elementary ("Goofgirl") (ABC)
- Long Story Short ("Yoshi's Bar Mitzvah") (Netflix)
- Resident Alien ("The End Is Here") (Peacock)

Limited Series Teleplay

- **Washington Black ("The Flying Man & The Musician")** (Showtime)
- Beef ("Oh, The Comfort, The Inexpressible Comfort") (Netflix)
- DTF St. Louis ("No One’s Normal. It Just Looks That Way from Across the Street") (HBO)
- Hal & Harper ("Are You Watching?") (Mubi)

Children's Teleplay

- **Tab Time ("When We Lose Someone")** (Amazon)
- E.B. White's Charlotte's Web ("Part 3") (HBO)
- My Brother the Minotaur ("Lunacy and Lorcan") (Apple TV+)
- The Proud Family: Louder and Prouder ("The Shade of it All") (Disney+)

Drama Feature

- **All That's Left Of You**
- Preparation For The Next Life
- Song Sung Blue
- Train Dreams

Comedy Feature

- **Rental Family**
- A Nice Indian Boy
- The Invite
- The Baltimorons

Documentary (Feature)

- **The Tale of Silyan**
- Come See Me in the Good Light
- Life After
- Shuffle **Documentary (Docuseries, Single Episode)**
  - **Katrina: Come Hell and High Water (“Shelter of Last Resort”)**
  - Billy Joel: And So It Goes ("Part Two")
  - Mel Brooks: The 99 Year Old Man! ("Part Two")
  - Rise of the 49ers ("We Built This City")

Family Feature

- **Grow**
- Elio
- Hoppers
- KPop Demon Hunters

Short Film

- **Vital**
- Beyond Unstoppable
- Double Happiness
- The Birthday Gift
