= Humanitas Prize for 30 Minute Network or Syndicated Television =

The Humanitas Prize for 30 Minute Network or Syndicated Television is an award presented to the best written 30-minute network or syndicated television program. The winners are indicated in bold.

== 1975 (1st) ==
- Good Times:
  - "The Lunch Money Rip-Off" — John Baskin & Roger Schulman
  - "My Girl Henrietta" — Bob Peete
- **Sunshine: "Angel of Doom" — M. Charles Cohen**

== 1976 (2nd) ==
- Doc — Seth Freeman
- M*A*S*H:
  - **"The Interview" — Larry Gelbart**
  - "Quo Vadis, Captain Chandler?" — Burt Prelutsky

== 1977 (3rd) ==
- All in the Family: "Archie's Brief Encounter - Part II" — Larry Rhine & Mel Tolkin
- M*A*S*H: "Dear Sigmund" — Alan Alda
- **The Mary Tyler Moore Show: "Ted's Change of Heart" — Earl Pomerantz**

== 1978 (4th) ==
- **All in the Family: "The Brother" — Larry Rhine & Mel Tolkin**
- Barney Miller: "Goodbye, Mr. Fish - Part II" — Reinhold Weege
- The Jeffersons: "984 W. 124th St., Apt. 5C" — John Baskin & Roger Shulman

== 1979 (5th) ==
- All in the Family: "Edith Gets Fired" — Teleplay by Harriett Weiss & Patt Shea; Story by Mort Lachman
- M*A*S*H: "Point of View" — Ken Levine and David Isaacs
- **Taxi: "Blind Date" — Michael Leeson**

== 1980 (6th) ==
- **M*A*S*H: "Dreams" — Teleplay by Alan Alda; Story by Alan Alda and James Jay Rubinfier**
- United States: "Uncle Charlie" — Gary Markowitz
- WKRP in Cincinnati: "God Talks to Johnny" — Hugh Wilson

== 1981 (7th) ==
- Archie Bunker's Place: "Tough Love" — Patt Shea and Harriett Weiss
- M*A*S*H: "Blood Brothers" — Elias Davis & David Pollock
- **WKRP in Cincinnati: "Venus Flytrap Explains" — Hugh Wilson**

== 1982 (8th) ==
- Archie Bunker's Place: "Relapse" — Patt Shea & Harriett Weiss
- **M*A*S*H: "Where There's a Will, There's a War" — Elias Davis & David Pollock**
- One Day at a Time: "Mrs. O'Leary's Kid" — Paul Perlove

== 1983 (9th) ==
- Diff'rent Strokes: "Bicycle Man II" — Blake Hunter
- It Takes Two: "Death Penalty" — Susan Harris
- **M*A*S*H: "Who Knew?" — Elias Davis & David Pollock**

== 1984 (10th) ==
- Family Ties:
  - **"Not an Affair to Remember" — Gary David Goldberg & Ruth Bennett**
  - "Say Uncle" — Ruth Bennett
- Gimme a Break!: "Herbie" — Arthur Julian

== 1985 (11th) ==
- The Cosby Show:
  - **"Theo and the Joint" — John Markus**
- Family Ties:
  - "Hotline Fever" — Marc Lawrence
  - "Remembrance of Things Past - Part II" — Gary David Goldberg & Alan Uger

== 1986 (12th) ==
- The Cosby Show:
  - **"Denise's Friend" — John Markus**
  - "An Early Spring" — Matt Williams
  - "Truth or Consequences" — John Markus & Carmen Finestra & Gary Kott
- Mr. Sunshine — David Lloyd

== 1987 (13th) ==
- The Cosby Show: "The March" — Gary Kott
- Family Ties: "My Back Pages" — Ruth Bennett
- **Kate & Allie: "Jennie & Jason" — Bob Randall**

== 1988 (14th) ==
- **Frank's Place: "The Bridge" — Hugh Wilson**
- Kate & Allie: "Brother, Can You Spare a Dime?" — Teleplay Bob Randall & William Persky; Story by Anne Flett-Giordano (as Anne Flett) & Chuck Ranberg
- The Wonder Years: "Pilot" — Neal Marlens & Carol Black

== 1989 (15th) ==
- Baby Boom: "Guilt" — Nancy Meyers & Charles Shyer
- **The Wonder Years: "Pottery Will Get You Nowhere" — Matthew Carlson**

== 1990 (16th) ==
- Why, Charlie Brown, Why? — Charles M. Schulz
- The Wonder Years:
  - "The Powers That Be" — David M. Stern
  - **"Square Dance" — Todd W. Langen**

== 1991 (17th) ==
- Doogie Howser, M.D.: "To Live and Die in Brentwood" — Nat Bernstein & Mitchel Lee Katlin
- The Wonder Years:
  - **"Goodbye" — Bob Brush**
  - "The Ties That Bind" — Mark B. Perry

== 1992 (18th) ==
- **Brooklyn Bridge: "Boys of Summer" — John Masius**
- Captain Planet and the Planeteers: "The Ark" — Doug Molitor
- A Different World: "Mammy Dearest" — Glenn Berenbeim
- Roseanne: "This Old House" — Teleplay by Chuck Lorre & Jeff Abugov; Story by Michael Poryes
- The Wonder Years: "Hardware Store" — Craig Hoffman

== 1993 (19th) ==
- Roseanne:
  - **"Terms of Estrangement - Part II" — Rob Ulin**
  - "Wait 'Til Your Father Gets Home" — Amy Sherman-Palladino (as Amy Sherman)
- The Wonder Years: "Nose" — Sy Rosen

== 1994 (20th) ==
- Edith Ann: A Few Pieces of the Puzzle — Jane Wagner
- Frasier: "The Good Son" — David Angell & Peter Casey & David Lee
- The John Larroquette Show: "Amends" — Don Reo & Judith D. Allison
- **Murphy Brown: "Reaper Madness" — Rob Bragin**

== 1995 (21st) ==
- Blossom: "The Date" — Allan Katz
- Grace Under Fire: "Grace Under Water" — Marc Flanagan
- **The John Larroquette Show: "Faith" — David Richardson**
- Roseanne: "White Men Can't Kiss" — Rob Ulin & Kevin Abbott

== 1996 (22nd) ==
- **Frasier: "Breaking the Ice" — Steve Levitan**
- Grace Under Fire: "No Help Wanted" — Stevie Ray Fromstein
- Home Improvement: "The Longest Day" — Elliot Shoenman & Marley Sims

== 1997 (23rd) ==
- Grace Under Fire: "Pills" — Stevie Ray Fromstein
- Roseanne: "The Miracle" — Written by Drew Ogier; Story by Roseanne Barr (as Roseanne)
- **Something So Right: "Something About An Older Guy" — Bob Tischler**

== 1998 (24th) ==
- Foto-Novelas: "The Fix" — Bennett Cohen and Edit Villareal
- Frasier: "The Kid" — Jeffrey Richman and Suzanne Martin
- **Murphy Brown: "Turpis Capillis Annus (Bad Hair Year)" — Marilyn Suzanne Miller**

== 1999 (25th) ==
- Everybody Loves Raymond: "Frank's Tribute" — Eric Cohen
- Sports Night:
  - "The Quality of Mercy at 29K" — Bill Wrubel and Aaron Sorkin
  - **"The Six Southern Gentlemen of Tennessee" — Aaron Sorkin and Matt Tarses & David Walpert & Bill Wrubel**

== 2000 (26th) ==
- 3rd Rock from the Sun: "Dick, Who's Coming to Dinner" — David Goetsch & Jason Venokur
- **Frasier: "Something About Dr. Mary" — Jay Kogen**
- Smart Guy: "Never Too Young" — Steven B. Young

== 2001 (27th) ==
- **Everybody Loves Raymond: "Ray's Journal" — Jennifer Crittenden**
- Frasier: "Frasier's Edge" — Jon Sherman & Dan O'Shannon
- Malcolm in the Middle: Larry Strawther

== 2002 (28th) ==
- **Scrubs: "My Old Lady" — Matt Tarses**
- State of Grace:
  - "Looking for God in All the Right Places" — Steven Peterman & Gary Dontzig
  - "Love, Love, Me Do" — Brenda Lilly & Hollis Rich

== 2003 (29th) ==
- The Bernie Mac Show:
  - "Sweet Home Chicago - Part I" — Teleplay by Warren Hutcherson and Kriss Turner; Story by Larry Wilmore
  - **"Sweet Home Chicago - Part II" — Teleplay by Teri Schaffer and Steve Tompkins; Story by Larry Wilmore**
- Frasier: "Rooms With A View" — Dan O'Shannon & Lori Kirkland & Bob Daily

== 2004 (30th) ==
- The Bernie Mac Show:
  - "Eye of the Tiger" — Richard Appel
  - "Saving Sergeant Tompkins" — Jacqueline R. Clay
- Scrubs: "My Screwup" — Garrett Donovan & Neil Goldman

== 2006 (32nd) ==
- George Lopez: "The Kidney Stays in the Picture" — Jim Hope
- **My Name Is Earl: Pilot — Gregory Thomas Garcia (as Greg Garcia)**
- Scrubs: "My Way Home" — Garrett Donovan & Neil Goldman

== 2007 (33rd) ==
- **The New Adventures of Old Christine: "Oh God, Yes" — Jennifer Crittenden**
- Scrubs: "My Fallen Idol" — Bill Callahan
- The War at Home: "Kenny Doesn't Live Here Anymore" — Rob Lotterstein

== 2008 (34th) ==
- The Bill Engvall Show: "Aloha, Raffles" — Kathy Ann Stumpe
- In Treatment: "Sophie - Week Two" — Sarah Treem
- **Scrubs: "My Long Goodbye" — Dave Tennant**

== 2009 (35th) ==
- 30 Rock: "Believe in the Stars" — Robert Carlock
- How I Met Your Mother: "Happily Ever After" — Jamie Rhonheimer
- **Scrubs: "My Last Words" — Aseem Batra**
- The Simpsons: "All About Lisa" — John Frink

== 2010 (36th) ==
- Meet the Browns: "Meet the Racist" — Myra J. Hughes (as Myra J)
- The Middle: "The Block Party" — Alex Reid
- **Modern Family: Pilot — Steve Levitan & Christopher Lloyd**
- **Nurse Jackie: Pilot — Liz Brixius & Linda Wallem and Evan Dunsky**
- The Simpsons: "The Greatest Story Ever D'ohed" — Kevin Curran

== 2011 (37th) ==
- The Big C: "Taking the Plunge" — Darlene Hunt
- How I Met Your Mother: "Last Words" — Carter Bays & Craig Thomas
- **Modern Family: "The Kiss" — Abraham Higginbotham**
- Nurse Jackie: "Monkey Bits" — Liz Brixius

== 2012 (38th) ==
- The Big C: "A Little Death" — Jenny Bicks
- The Middle: "The Map" — DeAnn Heline & Eileen Heisler
- **Modern Family: "Aunt Mommy" — Abraham Higginbotham & Dan O'Shannon**
