= Edith Ann: A Few Pieces of the Puzzle =

1994 animated television

Edith Ann: A Few Pieces of the Puzzle is a 1994 animated television special created by Lily Tomlin. It was produced by Klasky Csupo. The main character, Edith Ann, was created by Tomlin for the 1968 sketch comedy show Rowan & Martin's Laugh-In. The special aired on January 18, 1994 on ABC.

Tomlin and partner Jane Wagner created the special in the hopes of developing it into a series. While this did not come to pass, two more specials followed: Edith Ann: Homeless Go Home (1994) and Edith Ann's Christmas (Just Say Noël) (1996).
