= There Are No Angels Here =

- ER episode
- Episode no.: Season 12; Episode 20
- Directed by: Christopher Chulack
- Written by: R. Scott Gemmill and David Zabel
- Original air date: May 4, 2006

Episode chronology
← Previous "No Place To Hide"	Next → "The Gallant Hero and The Tragic Victor"
- ER season 12

"There Are No Angels Here" is the 20th episode of the 12th season of the American medical drama television series ER, and the 265th episode overall. It was written by R. Scott Gemmill and David Zabel and directed by Christopher Chulack, and originally aired on NBC on May 4, 2006.

== Plot synopsis ==
This episode is set exclusively in Darfur. Pratt is still put out and feeling out of place as he tries to work in the clinic. He argues with Dr Dakarai on the solutions to Darfur's problems. Pratt thinks that Sudan should sort itself out. Dr Dakarai pulls him up on this and Pratt notes that just because he's black doesn't mean he has to feel at home in Africa. They spot a mother with a sick baby and persuade her to come to the clinic but when she is there they find there is nothing they can do for her. Pratt wants to try but Carter tells him they don’t have the resources to keep the baby alive. Carter tells the woman about his own son dying in hospital (see episode Midnight) but she says she finds it hard to believe that babies die in western hospitals.

Meanwhile Carter and Debbie reach the police station and speak to the officer in charge. He won’t even let them see the prisoner. Carter threatens to report them for walking in on Debbie in the shower. With this threat and a bribe they are allowed into the cells. Carter finds the Sheik and inspects him. He tells the guard that the man is dead. They are allowed to take the body and they load him into the back of the jeep. As soon as they are away from the police station Carter starts to treat the Sheik – he is not dead, but he is close to it.

In the camp Carter and Debbie have saved the Sheik. He is holding his daughter for the first time. Pratt arrives and relays the news. The Sheik’s wife will live but Dr. Dakarai is missing. Debbie, Dr. Dakarai’s partner, wants to go out and search but it is too late in the day. An exhausted Pratt walks through the camp looking at the people. In the distance he sees a commotion. It is Dr. Dakarai walking back into camp. He left the jeep as soon as Pratt had gone and has been walking back ever since. Pratt hugs him. Debbie kisses him. Carter is amazed. The Sheik and his wife name their daughter Amala, a name that means ‘hope’.

== Guest starring ==
- Noah Wyle as Dr. John Carter
- Eamonn Walker as Dr. Stephen Dakarai
- Mary McCormack as Debbie

== Awards ==
The 2007 Humanitas Prize, in the 60 Minute Category, was awarded to scriptwriters R. Scott Gemmill and David Zabel for "There Are No Angels Here".
