= The Littles (TV series) =

Animated television series

- Created by: John Peterson; Jim Schumann
- Based on: The Littles by John Peterson
- Developed by: Woody Kling
- Directed by: Bernard Deyries
- Voices of: Jimmy Keegan; Donavan Freberg; Robert David Hall; Bettina Bush; Alvy Moore; Laurel Page; B. J. Ward; Gregg Berger; Patricia Parris
- Music by: Haim Saban; Shuki Levy
- Countries of origin: United States; France (season 1)
- Original languages: English; French
- No. of seasons: 3
- No. of episodes: 29

Production
- Producers: Jean Chalopin; Andy Heyward; Tetsuo Katayama
- Animators: Tokyo Movie Shinsha (season 1); Gallop (seasons 2–3)
- Running time: 22 minutes
- Production companies: DIC (Note: The first season was produced by DIC Audiovisuel while the second and third seasons were produced by its American branch DIC Enterprises.); ABC Entertainment

Original release
- Network: ABC (United States); Canal+ (France, season 1); TF1 (France, seasons 2–3)
- Release: September 10, 1983 – November 2, 1985

The Littles (French: Les Minipouss) is an animated television series whose original episodes aired from September 10, 1983, to November 2, 1985. It is based on the characters from The Littles, a series of children's novels by American author John Peterson, the first of which was published in 1967. The series was produced for the American broadcast network ABC by the French/American studio DIC Audiovisuel. It was post-produced by a Canadian animation studio, Animation City Editorial Services.

== Characters ==
=== The Little family ===
- Tom Little is the older of the two Little children.
- Lucy Little is the younger of the two Little children.
- Grandpa Little is the oldest member of the family.
- Dinky Little is a cousin of the family (as in the books, where he is always presented as 'cousin Dinky').
- Frank Little is the father in the family.
- Helen Little is the mother in the family and the daughter of Grandpa Little.
- Ashley Little is a second, younger cousin of the family.

In the television series, the family tree is mostly clear. Frank and Helen are the parents of Tom and Lucy, Grandpa is the father of Helen, and Dinky is a cousin (on Helen's side, as said by Grandpa in the episode "Ben Dinky") of Tom and Lucy. In the books, the family tree is never explicitly identified. The Littles that often appear are Tom, Lucy, Dinky and Grandpa.

=== Supporting characters ===
- Henry Bigg is a 13-year-old boy and one of the few humans who knows about the existence of the Littles. They live in his house and are his best friends.
- Slick is a little turtle and Henry's pet.

=== Villains ===
- Dr. Erick Hunter is a scientist whose primary goal is to prove the existence of the Littles. He often builds machines that can detect these tiny humans to prove to the others and himself that the Littles really exist. As such, the Little family must be on guard and Henry must work to thwart him. The Little community at large has a defense force to watch for Dr. Hunter and those of his ilk. Dr. Hunter's plans often get him in trouble with the police.
- James Peterson is Dr. Hunter's assistant. He is named for series creator John Peterson.

=== Other characters ===
- Mr. and Mrs. Bigg are Henry's parents. Both archeologists, they often go on journeys.
- Marie is Henry's classmate and close friend.

== Voice cast ==
- Jimmy Keegan as Henry Bigg
- Alvy Moore as Grandpa Little
- Gregg Berger as Frank Little
- Patricia Parris as Helen Little
- Donavan Freberg as Tom Little (seasons 1–2)
- David Wagner as Tom Little (season 3)
- Bettina Bush as Lucy Little
- B. J. Ward as Ashley Little (seasons 2–3)
- Frank Welker as Slick (season 1)
- Pat Fraley as Slick (seasons 2–3)
- Robert David Hall as Mr. Bigg and Dinky Little
- Laurel Page as Mrs. Bigg
- Ken Sansom as Dr. Hunter and Peterson (seasons 1–2)

Rachelle Cano and Rebecca Venture provide the opening and closing theme vocals.

=== Additional voices ===
- Candace Craig
- Paul Eiding
- Jonathan Goldsmith
- David Hollander
- Erv Immerman
- Tress MacNeille
- Mona Marshall
- Julie McWhirter
- Hal Smith - Mr. Finnegan (in "When Irish Eyes are Smiling")
- Marilyn Schreffler
- John Stephenson
- Russi Taylor

== Episodes ==
A dagger (†) denotes an episode that was not rerun in syndication.

=== Season 1 (1983) ===
No. overall	No. in season	Title	Written by	Original release date
1	1	"Beware of Hunter!"	Jeffrey Scott	September 10, 1983
Henry's friendship with Tom and Lucy causes problems with the Littles' Council when Dr. Hunter searches Henry's house to find evidence of the Littles' existence.
2	2	"Lost City of the Littles"†	Jeffrey Scott	September 17, 1983
Henry's parents discover a statue with a tail (portraying an ancient Little ruler), which also piques Dr. Hunter's interest. When Henry learns that the statue will hypnotize all Littles and call them to it, he decides to steal the statue to save his friends.
3	3	"The Big Scare"	Jeffrey Scott	September 24, 1983
Henry spends the night in a haunted house as part of an initiation to join a bicycle club. The other members, though, have malevolent plans for Henry, and the Littles must help him turn the tables.
4	4	"Lights, Camera, Littles"	Jeffrey Scott	October 1, 1983
When The Littles make "The Little Wizard of Oz", Tom becomes jealous of Lucy and decides to dispose of the film. In the process, however, it gets into Dr. Hunter's hands.
5	5	"The Spirits of the Night"	Jeffrey Scott	October 8, 1983
The Littles come into the house of a blind elderly woman and decide to help her out, such as when her sink is running they shut it off to prevent flooding. They come across the journal of her late husband, which tells that he hid $50,000 cash. The old lady's landlord gets hold of the journal, however, and seeks to claim the money for himself. The Littles must work to thwart the landlord and get the blind woman her rightful inheritance.
6	6	"The Little Winner"	Jeffrey Scott	October 15, 1983
Dinky wins a contest for a gasoline-powered model airplane, and is required to come to the model company's office in a huge city to pick up the contest prize. Since Dinky is a Little and risks exposing himself, Henry offers to help claim the prize, since he is in the city visiting relatives at the moment.
7	7	"A Big Cure for a Little Illness"	Jeffrey Scott	October 22, 1983
After Helen is poisoned by one of Dr. Hunter's chemicals, Henry fakes an illness to obtain the antidote.
8	8	"The Rats Are Coming! The Rats Are Coming!"	Jeffrey Scott	October 29, 1983
During a heavy rainstorm, swarms of rats invade Henry's neighborhood and cause problems for both the Littles and the people in the area. The Little community tries to solve the problem by laying bait for all the rats then triggering a fire alarm.
9	9	"The Little Fairy Tale"	Jeffrey Scott	November 5, 1983
Marie, Henry's friend, runs away when she does not get all A's on her report card. It is up to Tom, Lucy and the other Littles to convince Marie to return.
10	10	"Prescription for Disaster"†	Jeffrey Scott	November 12, 1983
The Littles go to visit some relatives. They discover that a single mother living in the same apartment is abusing prescription medication. To make matters worse, one of the pills accidentally gets loose and ends up in some food Dinky is eating.
11	11	"The Little Scouts"	Jeffrey Scott	November 19, 1983
Grandpa, Dinky, Tom, Lucy and the Little Scouts are out camping in the forest. Their trip becomes urgent when an Air Force pilot has been forced to eject and is found unconscious in the woods. Grandpa warns the Littles that the man could die if left untreated for too long, and the Littles must figure out a way to alert men of the downed pilot's situation without revealing themselves.
12	12	"A Little Gold, A Lot of Trouble"	Jeffrey Scott	November 26, 1983
Henry and Marie get stuck in a mine shaft, and it is up to the Littles to rescue them.
13	13	"Dinky's Doomsday Pizza"†	Jeffrey Scott	December 3, 1983
Dinky exposes the Littles' existence when delivering pizzas by glider and Henry betrays the Littles' existence to Dr. Hunter in exchange for fame. The Littles are captured and put in a lab, to be fed pizza. Dinky then realizes his glider crashed and that episode was only a hallucination.

=== Season 2 (1984) ===
No. overall	No. in season	Title	Written by	Original release date
14	1	"A Little Rock and Roll"	Dave Brain	September 8, 1984
When Henry's (and the Littles') favorite band, the Copacetics, holds a concert in Grand Valley, Tom, Lucy, and Cousin Ashley decide to attend despite Mr., Mrs., and Grandpa Little forbidding the kids to go.
15	2	"The Little Babysitters"	Jeffrey Scott	September 15, 1984
Henry promises to babysit for his parents but when he gets an invitation to play football from his friends, he has the Littles take over for him instead. A fire then breaks out, but Henry manages to put it out with help from the Littles. In the end, Henry faces the music for his poor judgment, in that Mr. Bigg grounds him and demands he pay for the damages caused by the fire out of his allowance.
16	3	"The Forest Littles"	Jack Olesker	September 22, 1984
The Littles discover a race of Littles in the forest and help them evade a ferret that Dr. Hunter has set loose after them.
17	4	"For The Birds"	Jack Olesker	September 29, 1984
When The Littles' Council decides to start a zoo, Tom and Lucy find an injured bird but keep it a secret from Ashley and the others for fear it will become an exhibit.
18	5	"Twins"	Jack Olesker	October 6, 1984
Dinky becomes jealous when Littles twins are born, taking all the attention away from him and his latest invention – a gas-powered car. He stages a stunt show during which he is nearly killed, but when the twins still get all the attention, Dinky steals a brass bed that Henry got for them.
19	6	"Looking for Grandma Little"†	Jeffrey Scott	October 13, 1984
Grandpa leaves home feeling neglected when Tom and Lucy try to find him a female companion to keep him from being lonely.
20	7	"Every Little Vote Counts"	Marc Scott Zicree	October 20, 1984
As a result of Dr. Hunter redoubling his efforts, the mayor of the Littles prohibits the Littles from going to the surface. This does not sit well with Little society, and the mayor's approval rating takes a hit. Meanwhile, a Little named Smilin' Al visits the community, traveling the world with his pet dog. Smiling Al takes advantage of the mayor's unpopularity to unseat him in the upcoming election, promising no restrictions on Little travel. Note: This episode marks the last appearances of Dr. Hunter and Peterson.
21	8	"The Littles' Halloween"	Michael Reaves	October 27, 1984
On Halloween, Henry explores an old house rumored to be inhabited by an evil magician who turns kids into cats and Littles into mice.

=== Season 3: Around the World (1985) ===
No. overall	No. in season	Title	Written by	Original release date
22	1	"The Little Amazon Queen"†	Jim Schumann	September 14, 1985
The Biggs visit the Amazon jungle to find a missing girl and a rare diamond, while the Littles find an ancient race of Littles in the jungle.
23	2	"Tut the Second"†	Jack Olesker	September 21, 1985
While visiting Egypt, Henry and the Littles are kidnapped and taken to a pyramid, where Henry is thought to be the reincarnation of King Tut. Henry enjoys the attention until he learns he will be spending the rest of his life inside the pyramid.
24	3	"When Irish Eyes Are Smiling"	Eleanor Burian-Mohr	September 28, 1985
When the Biggs visit Ireland, Dinky is caught by Mr. Finnegan, who thinks he is a leprechaun.
25	4	"The Wrong Stuff"†	Michael Reaves	October 5, 1985
The Littles find themselves accidentally sent into orbit on the Space Shuttle and Dinky is forced to return a computer chip he took as a souvenir to keep the shuttle from burning up on re-entry.
26	5	"Deadly Jewels"†	Jack Olesker	October 12, 1985
While visiting India, Henry gets his camera case mixed up with that of a princess, who discovers the Littles but promises to keep their secret. The Littles, in turn, learn of a plot to steal the crown jewels.
27	6	"A Little Drunk"	Marc Scott Zicree	October 19, 1985
Henry discovers that his favorite Hollywood movie star is an alcoholic who does not even do his own stunts. Meanwhile, Dinky, who thinks drinking is cool, gets drunk himself and nearly causes an accident.
28	7	"Ben Dinky"†	Michael Maurer	October 26, 1985
While visiting Rome, the Littles find the Italian Littles are under the oppression of a still existing Roman Empire. Dinky is mistaken for a great gladiator, and uses it to challenge a Little Emperor.
29	8	"The Little Girl Who Could"	Marc Scott Zicree	November 2, 1985
The Littles visit their cousins in the country. When one of them mentions buried treasure, Tom and Ashley go off in search of it and at the end they regret it when they get in trouble.

== Television history ==
Along with Inspector Gadget and Heathcliff and the Catillac Cats, The Littles was one of the first cartoons produced by DIC Entertainment for American television, and it was the only one of the three to air on a network rather than in syndication.

The first two seasons of shows featured The Littles around the Bigg household, while the final season featured the Littles traveling around the world.

The series also had two film tie-ins:

- The Littles starred in their first animated feature, Here Come the Littles, which serves as a prequel to the television series. It was directed by Bernard Deyriès and written by Woody Kling. It was released on May 25, 1985 and is available on DVD.
- The following year (1986), a made-for-TV film was created starring the Littles: Liberty and the Littles. This film was also directed by Bernard Deyriès. It was written by Marc Scott Zicree. It aired in three parts during the tenth season of ABC Weekend Special. It was subsequently edited into a three-part episode and included in the third season of the series. The episode is available on DVD.

In 2003, the series began to air on the syndicated DIC Kids Network block in order to fulfill E/I criteria, but not every episode of the series was syndicated during this run.

The series was also broadcast in the United Kingdom on TVAM and in Australia on Network 10. Many other countries also picked up the series.

== Home media ==
VHS/DVD name	Ep #	Distributor	Release date	Additional information
Liberty and the Littles	Liberty and The Littles	Strand VCI Entertainment (ABC Kidtime)	1991	
The Littles Christmas Special	Looking for Grandma Little; Spirits of the Night; The Little Girl who Could; The Little Scouts (DVD only)	Sterling Entertainment Group (2003); NCircle Entertainment (2007)	November 13, 2003; October 23, 2007	Despite the name, the episodes on this release have nothing to do with the Christmas holiday.
The Littles: The Complete Unedited Series	All 29 episodes on 5 discs	S'More Entertainment (in association with Shout! Factory)	November 13, 2007	Bonus features: Storyboard to episode comparison (Disc 1); Complete storyboard for the episode "Prescription for Disaster" (Disc 1, DVD-ROM feature); "How Would the Littles Use...?" Trivia Game (Disc 2); Big/Little Scrounge List (Disc 2, reward for completing the trivia game); Big/Little Scrounge List PDF (Disc 2, DVD-ROM feature); "Little Ideas for Big People" PSAs (Disc 3); Interview with Marc Scott Zicree (Disc 3); Liberty and The Littles (Disc 4); Show Bumpers (Disc 4); Show Bible (Disc 4, DVD-ROM feature); Visual history of the DIC logo (Disc 5); Pilot outline (Disc 5, DVD-ROM feature)
The Best of The Littles	First 10 episodes	Mill Creek Entertainment	July 19, 2011	
The Littles: The Complete Series	All 29 episodes on 3 discs	Mill Creek Entertainment	July 19, 2011	Bonus content: Here Come the Littles; Liberty and The Littles; The Best of The Get Along Gang DVD promo

== Other merchandise ==
Some of the merchandise that was released during the series run included tie-in story books, a Milton Bradley board game, stickers and greeting cards. Foreign merchandise included many more items such as Halloween masks, a set of figures, card game, VHS videos, records, and more.

== See also ==
- Here Come the Littles, 1985 animated feature film
