= Here Come the Littles =

1985 film by Bernard Deyriès

- Original theatrical poster
- Directed by: Bernard Deyriès
- Screenplay by: Woody Kling
- Based on: The Littles by John Peterson
- Produced by: Jean Chalopin; Andy Heyward; Tetsuo Katayama; Koji Takeuchi; Yuji Toki
- Starring: Jimmy Keegan; Bettina Bush; Donavan Freberg; Hal Smith; Gregg Berger; Patricia Parris; Alvy Moore; Robert David Hall; Mona Marshall
- Edited by: Philippe Kotlarski; Masatoshi Tsurubuchi
- Music by: Shuki Levy; Haim Saban
- Production companies: ABC Entertainment; DIC Audiovisuel
- Distributed by: Atlantic Releasing
- Release date: May 24, 1985
- Running time: 75 minutes
- Countries: United States; France
- Language: English
- Box office: $6.6 million

Here Come the Littles is a 1985 animated fantasy film produced by DIC Audiovisuel and distributed by Atlantic Releasing. It was directed by Bernard Deyriès and adapted by Woody Kling from John Peterson's series of books, The Littles, and also based on the ABC television show of the same name.

Here Come the Littles follows a boy named Henry Bigg as he meets a family of miniature people that lives in his home. While his abusive uncle Augustus plans to build a shopping center at the site of his home, Henry teams up with the Littles to prevent this scheme.

Here Come the Littles was screened at weekend matinees during its original U.S. release, and made over US$6.5 million. It was not a critical success; reviewers found fault with the story and animation style. The film was released on VHS in late 1985, and on DVD in early 2004. (Note: Also of interest, although not quite TV-on-DVD material, is the feature film Here Come The Littles and the direct-to-video item Old McDonald's Sing-a-Long Farm, both also getting DVD releases on February 24, 2004.) Another Littles film, Liberty and the Littles, premiered on television in late 1986.

== Plot ==
Henry Bigg learns that his parents have been lost during an archaeological trip to Africa, although the remains of their aircraft have been found. His housekeeper Mrs. Evans says his Uncle Augustus is his next of kin and therefore his legal guardian. Meanwhile, Tom and Lucy Little (two of the tiny people inside the walls of Henry's house) snag an apple that Mrs. Evans had left for Henry. They repay the boy by finding his lucky rabbit's foot and sneaking it in his suitcase. They are carried away to Augustus' house, trapped inside the luggage. Another two of the tiny creatures named Grandpa and Dinky soon find them as Grandpa is familiar with Augustus' nature.

Henry moves to Augustus' residence where Mrs. Evans states that she cannot join him because Augustus does not need to have a housekeeper. While appearing friendly in the eyes of Mrs. Evans, he drops the routine when Mrs. Evans leaves and starts to treat Henry very cruelly, telling him that he will not have him shedding tears here as Augustus escorts him to his room.

The Littles see that Augustus treats Henry more like a slave and is planning on replacing his nephew's house with a shopping mall. While the creatures try to escape, Henry discovers Grandpa and Dinky, not knowing who—or what—they are. Augustus also sees them, but mistaking them for toys, grabs them from Henry and locks them in the desk drawer in his study. Here, Dinky and Grandpa discover that Augustus forged the documents in order to become Henry's legal guardian, as well as to steal and redevelop the Biggs' property.

To rescue those two, Lucy persuades Tom to talk to Henry—a bold move, considering that humans never knew about the creatures until recently. Grandpa and Dinky, whom Henry finds inside the study, both prove the evidence of Augustus' fraud. Before Augustus locks him inside his room, Henry soon creates a diversion allowing Tom and Lucy to save them.

Eventually, Lucy and Tom are hungry, and begin to search for food. Tom gets trapped in a jar of honey, and a change of plans ensues: the Littles must rescue Henry before they can save Tom. At first Grandpa resists, but consents since Henry have already met them.

After several attempts to escape, the Littles finally flee away aboard their gas-powered toy plane but cause a garage fire that wakes up Augustus. Henry attempts to go to the police station but gets lost and is eventually caught by his uncle. The Littles distract Augustus long enough for Henry to run down there. Meanwhile, Augustus orders the demolition crew by phone to start tearing down the Biggs' place.

When the Littles get to Henry's house, they split up. Grandpa looks for Mr. and Mrs. Little while the others try to sabotage the bulldozer. Both plans succeed just in the nick of time. The moment Augustus arrives and learns what happened, Henry and a police officer arrive. As Augustus tries to flee in his car, the police officer arrests him for proposed illegal destruction to private property, forgery and child abuse.

Henry is reunited with Mrs. Evans and prepares to meet his rediscovered parents at the airport. He casts a knowing wink at the gate as the Littles watch on.

== Voice cast ==
| Name | Character |
|---|---|
| Jimmy Keegan | Henry Bigg |
| Bettina Bush | Lucy Little |
| Donavan Freberg | Tom Little |
| Hal Smith | Uncle Augustus |
| Gregg Berger | Frank Little |
| Patricia Parris | Helen Little |
| Alvy Moore | Grandpa Little |
| Robert David Hall | Dinky Little |
| Mona Marshall | Mrs. Evans |

== Crew ==
- Wally Burr - recording director

== Release ==
Along with The Smurfs and the Magic Flute and The Secret of the Sword, Here Come the Littles was among the first animated films handled by U.S. distributor Atlantic Releasing. The film was based on the ABC TV series of the same name, and produced in France by DIC Entertainment in conjunction with ABC.

Here Come the Littles was released theatrically in early 1985, and was released on the VHS format in late 1985 by CBS/Fox's Playhouse Video label, under license from ABC Video Enterprises.

The VHS was re-released by BMG Kidz in late 1992 under the DIC Toon-Time Video label.

It was re-released on VHS and released on DVD by Sterling Entertainment Group on February 24, 2004. The DVD was re-issued by NCircle Entertainment on August 21, 2007.

In 1984, Scholastic Books published a 64-page tie-in adaptation of Here Come the Littles by Lorentz Carlson and John Lawrence Peterson.

== Reception ==
=== Box office ===
During its run in the North American market, Here Come the Littles grossed over US$6.5 million through weekend matinee showings.

=== Critical response ===
Here Come the Littles was not well-received with critics, receiving generally mixed reviews. Candice Russell of the South Florida Sun-Sentinel wrote: "[It] has all the panache of a Saturday-morning cartoon and just about as much heart. It's even in the same mode of repetitive crises every third minute".

The Los Angeles Times' film reviewer Charles Solomon, in assessing Here Come the Littles, said: "[It] boasts an international pedigree more complicated—and interesting—than its storyline". In his Movie Guide, Leonard Maltin gave it 1½ stars out of four and called it a "silly, boring animated effort". Likewise, the Blockbuster Entertainment Guide to Videos and Movies (1999) gave it two stars, and recommended it "for fans of the Littles book series only". Jerry Beck, in his Animated Movie Guide, gave it only one star and commented: "The film raises issues of homelessness, the loss of parents, and the importance of family and friends, in a mild, one-dimensional way". Along with Russell, he criticized the "bland style" of the animation, which was outsourced in Japan.

A review in the San Francisco Chronicle stated that Here Come the Littles "is an OK, though hardly memorable, entertainment for small children. Come to think of it, pity the runts of today who get nothing but mediocre big screen fare—when they get it at all".

== Sequel ==
A made-for-television follow-up, Liberty and the Littles, aired on the ABC network in 1986 as part of its Weekend Special anthology series. It first aired in three parts of 30 minutes, on October 18, October 25, and November 1. In the film, the Littles fly to the Statue of Liberty, and come across a group of French relatives who are under a tyrant's control.

According to one crew member, Liberty was planned for a theatrical release, but ended up on television because of a change in management during production.
