= The Secret Hide-Out =

1965 novel by John Peterson

The Secret Hide-Out is a children's novel written and illustrated by children's author John Peterson, who also created The Littles. It was originally published as a hardback title by Four Winds Press in 1965, then became a long-running paperback for Scholastic Press and its book clubs, through the 1970s.

== Plot ==
The book is an adventure story about two brothers, Matt and Sam Burns, who discover the minutes of the Viking Club, a secret society of boys from a generation or so earlier, in their grandmother's cellar.

While Sam wants to skip the log's details and go straight to look for their old meeting place (the Secret Hide-Out), Matt wants to see if they can first pass the club's membership tests, as they are explained, and be "worthy" of going as prospective members... if the Hide-Out still exists.

Another local boy called Beany joins them in their quest, after he passes the test. Following the map, they find the secret hide-out, and are greeted by the president of the 1938 Secret Viking Club – their own father, dressed as a tiger.

== Appendix ==
While the book does not include the complete "original" Viking Club log, it does include enough details and illustrations to show how such a club would initiate new members, and a style for presentation and decorum.

A section in the back gives full instructions on making regalia for club members, including masks, shields and (dull-pointed) spears. These could be easily made by the book's target audience, with mostly household materials; a bushel-basket lid is the hardest item to obtain.

== Sequel ==
The Viking Club was apparently based on Peterson's son Matt's own Viking Club, and the book doubtless inspired any number of "secret clubs" among its readers. A sequel to the book, Enemies of the Secret Hide-Out, appeared in 1966, and was also a longtime title for Scholastic. In this story, two boys try out for membership; when one is disqualified for cheating, he starts a rival club, and threatens to learn and expose the location of the hide-out.
