= Bettina Bush =

American actress

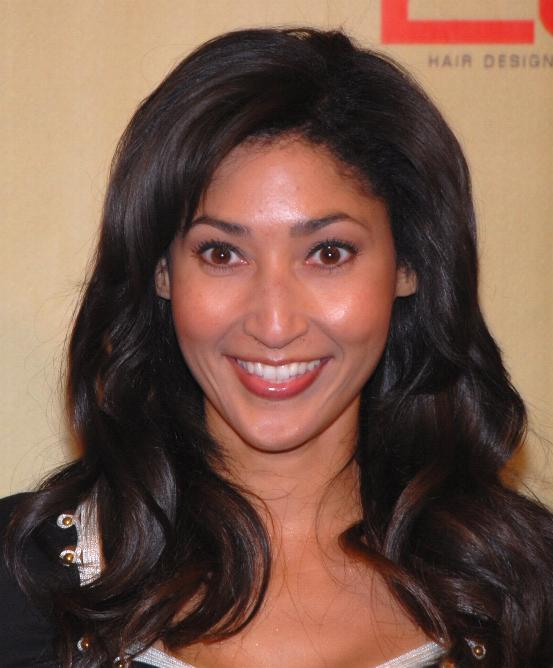
- Bush in 2007
- Born: Bettina Nicole Bush; Boston, Massachusetts, U.S.
- Other name: Tina Bush
- Occupations: Actress; singer
- Years active: 1980–present
- Musical career
- Genres: Pop
- Instruments: Vocals
- Website: www.bettinamusic.com

Bettina Nicole Bush, known professionally as Bettina, is an American actress and singer. She is known for voicing characters including Rainbow Brite, Lucy Little in The Littles, and Kai Green in Ben 10. Bush has also contributed to video games, including voicing Gloria in the Madagascar series, and has released pop music independently.

== Early life ==
Bush was born the youngest of three children. Her father was Charles V. Bush, the first African-American graduate of the US Air Force Academy and later a business executive, and her mother was of Scottish-Polynesian and Cherokee descent.

== Voice acting ==
Bettina's professional career began at the age of 5 when she began modeling and acting. Her acting career eventually led to voiceovers, including My Little Pony (as Megan), The Get Along Gang (as Dotty Dog), The Littles (as Lucy Little), Rugrats, All Grown Up! (as Alisa Carmichael), Stargate Infinity, Ben 10 (as Kai Green), Age of Empires III (as Nonahkee), God Hand (as Olivia), and is perhaps best known as the voice of Rainbow Brite and as the voice of Gloria in the Madagascar video games. She has also performed the McDonald's "I'm Lovin' It" commercial jingles. She starred as Maria, a teenage Native American girl, in the film Journey to Spirit Island (1988).

== Musical career ==
Her early influences in music include Dolly Parton and Elton John. Bettina's early singing talents can be heard on the title sing "Gift of Love" as the voice/singing voice of Rainbow Brite by Disneyland/Vista Records in 1985, and in the song "Make Room for a Rainbow Inside" again as voice/singing voice of Rainbow Brite in the Rainbow Brite Paint a Rainbow in Your Heart album also produced by Disneyland/Vista Records in 1984. Bettina also performed the songs "Brand New Day" and "Rainbow Brite and Me" for the feature film Rainbow Brite and the Star Stealer. Bettina later created her own record label company and financed, co-wrote, and performed her first independent release entitled "Lucky Girl". In 2006 she was named the winner of American Idol Underground in the pop category. Exposure from the show led to her being offered the opportunity to direct a music video. Along with it came the opportunity for her to co-write and edit three tracks with Sony Music producer/songwriter Automatic (P!nk, India.Arie). With them she has co-written and edited three tracks: "Emerald City", "Let Me Inside" and "I Can't Deny You". Her single titled "She Is" reached No. 4 on Billboard's Hot Singles Sales chart. Her debut album was set to be released in January 2008 but was never released.

== Filmography ==
=== Film ===
Bettina Bush' film credits
Year	Title	Role	Notes	Ref(s)
1985	Here Come the Littles	Lucy Little	Voice role	
1985	Rainbow Brite and the Star Stealer	Rainbow Brite	Voice role Credited as Bettina	
1985	It's Your Birthday Party with Rainbow Brite and Friends	Rainbow Brite	Voice role Credited as Bettina; Direct-to-video	
1986	Rainbow Brite: San Diego Zoo Adventure	Rainbow Brite	Voice role Uncredited; Direct-to-video	
1988	Journey to Spirit Island	Maria	Live-action role Credited as Bettina	
1997	A Christmas Carol	Voice	Voice role Direct-to-video	
2002	Inspector Gadget's Last Case: Claw's Revenge	Female Superhero	Voice role Credited as Tina Bush; Direct-to-video	
2006	Final Fantasy VII: Advent Children	Elena	Voice role Direct-to-video; English dub	

=== Television ===
Bettina Bush' television credits
Year	Title	Role	Notes	Ref(s)
1983	The Littles	Lucy Little	Voice role 29 episodes	
1984	Rainbow Brite	Rainbow Brite, Wisp	Voice role 13 episodes	
1984	The Get Along Gang	Dotty Dog	Voice role 13 episodes	
1986	ABC Weekend Specials	Lucy Little	Voice role Credited as Bettina; 1 episode	
1986	Moon Dreamers	Additional Voices	Voice role 2 episodes	
1986	My Little Pony	Megan, Additional Voices	Voice role 43 episodes	
1989	The Karate Kid	Additional Characters	Credited as Bettina; 1 episode	
1989	Superior Court	Azure Whitefoot	1 episode	
1989	Solarman	Voice	Voice role Television film	
1990	They Came from Outer Space	Ellen Clearwater	1 episode	
1995	Where on Earth Is Carmen Sandiego?	Voice	Voice role 10 episodes	
1999; 2001	Rugrats	Alisa Carmichael	Voice role 4 episodes	
2002	Groove Squad	Mackenzie "Mac"	Voice role Credited as Tina Bush; Television film	
2002	Sabrina: Friends Forever	Zelda Spellman	Voice role Credited as Tina Bush; Television film	
2002	Stargate Infinity	Seattle Montoya	Voice role 26 episodes	
2003	Sabrina's Secret Life	Zelda Spellman	Voice role Credited as Tina Bush	
2003	All Grown Up!	Alisa Carmichael	Voice role 10 episodes	
2007	Ben 10	Kai Green	Voice role Episode: "Benwolf"	
2014	Ben 10: Omniverse	Kai, Kai 10,000	Voice role 5 episodes	

=== Video games ===
Bettina Bush' video game credits
Year	Title	Role	Notes	Ref(s)
2005	Madagascar Animal Trivia DVD Game	Gloria	Voice role	
2005	Madagascar	Gloria	Voice role	
2005	Age of Empires III	Nonahkee	Voice role Credited as Bettina	
2006	Dead Rising	Additional voices	Voice role	
2006	God Hand	Olivia	Voice role English dub	
2006	Desperate Housewives: The Game	Voice	Voice role	
2008	Madagascar: Escape 2 Africa	Gloria	Voice role	
2009	Madagascar Kartz	Gloria	Voice role	
2011	Saints Row: The Third	Pedestrian, additional voices	Voice role	
2012	Madagascar 3: The Video Game	Gloria	Voice role	
2013	Saints Row IV	The Voices of Virtual Steelport	Voice role	
