= Moonrise (film) =

1948 film by Frank Borzage

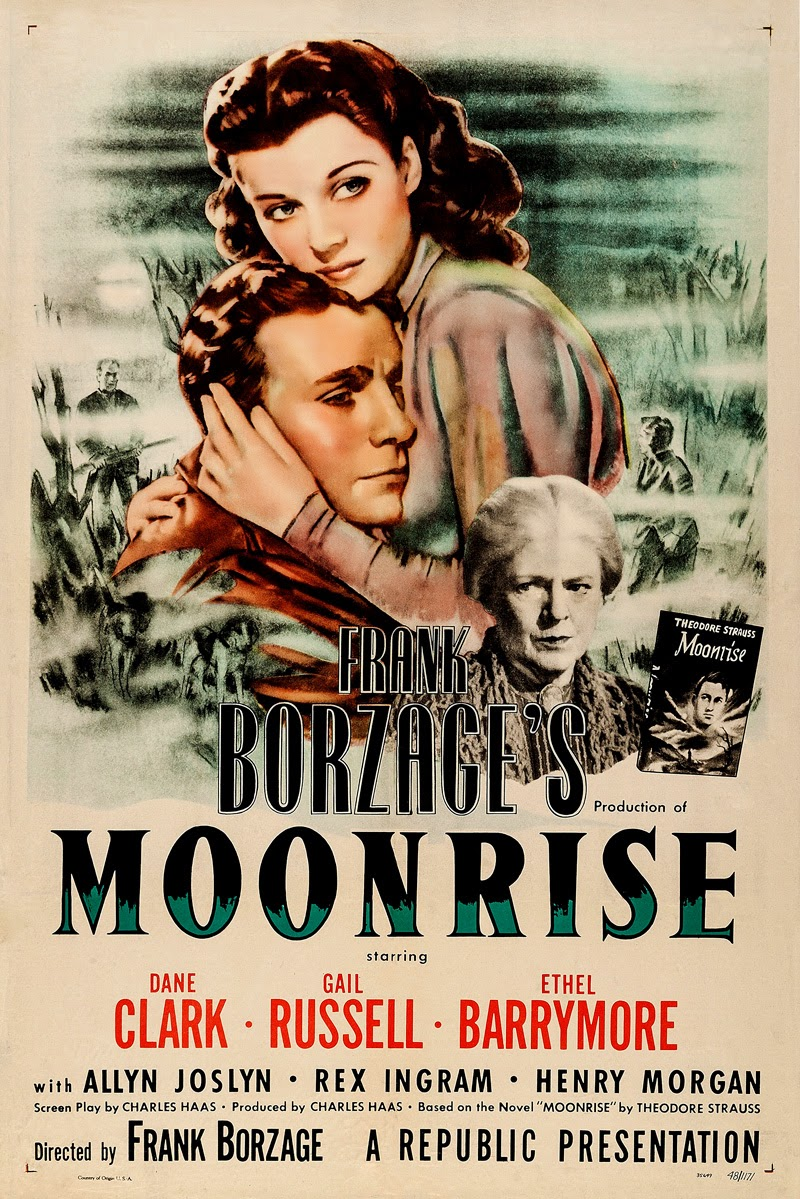
- Theatrical release poster
- Directed by: Frank Borzage
- Screenplay by: Charles F. Haas
- Based on: the novel Moonrise by Theodore Strauss
- Produced by: Charles F. Haas
- Starring: Dane Clark; Gail Russell; Ethel Barrymore
- Cinematography: John L. Russell
- Edited by: Harry Keller
- Music by: William Lava
- Color process: Black and white
- Production companies: Marshall Grant; Chas. K. Feldman Group Productions
- Distributed by: Republic Pictures
- Release date: October 1, 1948
- Running time: 90 minutes
- Country: United States
- Language: English
- Budget: $849,452

Moonrise is a 1948 American film noir crime film directed by Frank Borzage starring Dane Clark, Gail Russell and Ethel Barrymore. It is based on the 1946 novel of the same name by Theodore Strauss. The plot concerns the son of a man who was hanged for murder, leading to his own bullying by others and subsequent trials when he commits a crime in self-defense.

== Plot ==
In a small Virginia town, Danny Hawkins is the son of a murderer who was hanged for his crime. Throughout his childhood, he is haunted by his father's past and cruelly harassed by other children. As an adult, Danny is bullied by Jerry Sykes. After a particularly intense confrontation in the woods during a town dance, Danny and Jerry fight and Danny kills him in self-defense. Danny is unaware that he lost his pocket knife in the struggle. Danny then dances with Gilly Johnson, who was to be engaged to Jerry. While driving Gilly and two of their friends, Danny struggles with his guilt, and drives recklessly in the rain, crashing.

Gilly finds herself responding warmly to Danny's advances, even as she puzzles over Jerry's disappearance. After a few days, the body is found, and Sheriff Clem Otis starts closing in on the culprit. Thinking the sheriff has placed the blame on someone else, Danny goes to the fair with Gilly, but panics when Otis appears and seems to discover his guilt. The harmless mute Billy Scripture shows Danny that he has found his pocket knife, leading Danny to nearly strangle him. After hiding out at the swampy residence of the wise Mose Jackson, Danny visits his grandmother, who reveals that his father was in Danny's same remorseful position after his crime. Danny realizes he is not tainted by "bad blood" and turns himself in, giving him a more optimistic future.

== Cast ==
- Dane Clark as Danny Hawkins
- Gail Russell as Gilly Johnson
- Ethel Barrymore as Danny's Grandma
- Allyn Joslyn as Sheriff Clem Otis
- Rex Ingram as Mose Jackson
- Harry Morgan as Billy Scripture (as Henry Morgan)
- David Street as Ken Williams, the singer
- Selena Royle as Aunt Jessie
- Harry Carey Jr. as Jimmy Biff, car passenger
- Irving Bacon as Judd Jenkins
- Lloyd Bridges as Jerry Sykes
- Houseley Stevenson as Uncle Joe Jingle
- Phil Brown as Elmer - Soda Jerk
- Harry V. Cheshire as J.B. Sykes
- Lila Leeds as Julie, car passenger
- Virginia Mullen as Miss Simpkins
- Oliver Blake as Ed Conlon
- Tom Fadden as Homer Blackstone
- Charles Lane as Mr. Chandler, private detective
- Clem Bevans as Jake, coroner

== Production ==
In December 1945, Paramount Pictures purchased the rights to adapt Theodore Strauss's yet-to-be-released novel, which was serialized by Cosmopolitan in August and September 1946, and published as a book that October. Two independent producers purchased the film rights from Paramount, and reportedly spent $40,000 on advertising for the novel. The duo was unable to secure a completion bond, and were sued by William Wellman, whom they had hired as the film's director.

The film was ultimately made by Republic Pictures with Frank Borzage as director. It was a relatively high-budget film compared to Republic's Westerns, which usually cost around $50,000.

== Reception ==
The film flopped at the box office. The New York Times wrote that "the book towers above the picture" despite the latter's fidelity to the source. Eddie Muller listed it as one of his Top 25 Noir Films: "Relentlessly romantic optimistic Frank Borzage is the last guy you'd expect to turn out an effective film noir, but this was his sound era masterpiece, redemptive ending and all."

=== Accolades ===
Nomination: Moonrise received an Oscar nomination for Best Sound Recording (Daniel J. Bloomberg) in 1948.

== Home media ==
Moonrise was released on DVD and Blu-ray by The Criterion Collection on May 8, 2018.

== See also ==
- List of American films of 1948
