= Call to Glory =

American television series

- Genre: Action
- Created by: Ronald M. Cohen
- Directed by: Thomas Carter
- Starring: Keenan Wynn; Craig T. Nelson; Cindy Pickett; Elisabeth Shue; David Hollander; Gabriel Damon
- Composer: Charles Gross
- Country of origin: United States
- Original language: English
- No. of seasons: 1
- No. of episodes: 24 (2 unaired)

Production
- Production locations: Laughlin Air Force Base, Del Rio, Texas, USA; Beale Air Force Base, Marysville, California, USA
- Running time: 60 minutes
- Production companies: Tisch-Avnet Productions; Paramount Television

Original release
- Network: ABC
- Release: August 13, 1984 – June 30, 1985

Call to Glory is an American drama that aired for 22 episodes during the 1984–85 television season on ABC.

The show focuses on USAF pilot Colonel Raynor Sarnac (Craig T. Nelson) and his family, living near Edwards Air Force Base, where Sarnac was stationed during the early 1960s.

Heavily promoted during ABC's broadcast of the 1984 Summer Olympics, the pilot episode was aired August 13, 1984. The first episode is related to the U-2 flights over Cuba during the 1962 Cuban Missile Crisis. During its production run, the show came to focus more on the loneliness experienced by wife Vanessa Sarnac (Cindy Pickett) while stationed on base and what she and the family would do to spend time in productive pursuits while enduring the Antelope Valley's isolation from civilization.

The series also stars Elisabeth Shue in one of her early roles as the eldest Sarnac child, daughter Jackie. Also appearing in the series was David Lain Baker as Tom Bonelli; Baker would later become one of the judges on the competition show Forged in Fire. Other recurring characters include General Hampton (J.D. Cannon) and Lillie (Priscilla Pointer); and, less frequently, Christopher McDonald as Captain Riley.

Other actors who appeared in individual episodes include Jon Cedar, Anthony Edwards, Alan Fudge, John Fujioka, Courtney Gains, David Graf, Bruce Gray, Bradley Gregg, Malcolm-Jamal Warner, Lance LeGault, Jane Lillig, Dennis Lipscomb, Lin McCarthy, Read Morgan, J.A. Preston, and G. D. Spradlin.

== Cast ==
- Craig T. Nelson as Col. Raynor Sarnac
- David Lain Baker as Tom Bonelli
- Cindy Pickett as Vanessa Sarnac
- Elisabeth Shue as Jackie Sarnac
- Keenan Wynn as Carl Sarnac
- David Hollander as Wesley Sarnac
- Gabriel Damon as R.H. Sarnac
- Thomas O'Brien as Patrick Thomas

== Episodes ==
No.	Title	Directed by	Written by	Original release date
1	"Pilot"	Thomas Carter	Ronald M. Cohen	August 13, 1984
2	"Pilot"	Thomas Carter	Ronald M. Cohen	August 13, 1984
3	"The Move"	Peter Werner	Diane English	August 20, 1984
4	"Blackbird"	Ernest Pintoff	Brad Radnitz	August 27, 1984
5	"Paper Tiger"	Bill Duke	E. Jack Kaplan	September 3, 1984
6	"A Nation Divided"	Peter Werner	Carol Schreder	September 17, 1984
7	"Go / No Go"	Peter Levin	Max Jack	September 24, 1984
8	"Call It Courage"	Georg Sanford Brown	Linda Elstad	October 1, 1984
9	"A Wind from the East"	Peter Levin	Josef Anderson	October 8, 1984
10	"A Moment in the Sun"	Rick Wallace	David Chisholm	October 22, 1984
11	"Cover Story"	Unknown	Unknown	October 29, 1984
12	"Realities"	Ernest Pintoff	Elroy Schwartz and Carol Schreder & Brad Radnitz	November 12, 1984
13	"The Wake"	Rick Hauser	Story by : Brad Radnitz & W.J. Knight; Teleplay by : Brad Radnitz	November 19, 1984
14	"Medals All of Brass"	Gilbert Moses	Robert Sabaroff and Carol Schreder & Brad Radnitz	November 26, 1984
15	"A Wind of Change"	Jon Avnet	Story by : Jon Avnet; Teleplay by : Josef Anderson	December 3, 1984
16	"Give Unto Caesar"	Unknown	Unknown	December 17, 1984
17	"Moonchild"	Unknown	Unknown	January 15, 1985
18	"Images"	Unknown	Unknown	January 22, 1985
19	"Fathers and Sons"	Kevin Conner	Brad Radnitz	January 29, 1985
20	"Just in Time"	Unknown	Unknown	February 12, 1985
21	"The JFK Years"	Unknown	Unknown	June 30, 1985
22	"The JFK Years"	Unknown	Unknown	June 30, 1985
23	"Fathers and Daughters"	TBD	Story by : Brad Radnitz & Robert Lewin; Teleplay by : Josef Anderson & Carol Schreder	UNAIRED
24	"The End, the Beginning"	Craig T Nelson	Brad Radnitz	UNAIRED

== Production ==
Craig T. Nelson received familiarization rides in USAF jets at Edwards Air Force Base during the filming of the series, including flights in the T-38 Talon, the F-4 Phantom II, and the F-16 Fighting Falcon. On one particular flight in the F-16, the aircraft suffered an electrical failure. Nelson and his pilot prepared to bail out, however, the pilot was able to safely land the aircraft.

Call to Glory was filmed in Texas at Laughlin Air Force Base in Val Verde County, near Del Rio.
