= Nick Ramus =

American actor (1929–2007)

- Born: Nickolas George Ramus; September 9, 1929; Seattle, Washington, US
- Died: May 30, 2007 (aged 77); Benson, Arizona, US
- Occupation: Actor

Nickolas George Ramus, also known and credited as Nick Ramus, (September 9, 1929 – May 30, 2007) was a Blackfoot Native American actor, best known for his appearances on television.

== Early life ==
Ramus was born in Seattle, Washington, and grew up in Spokane, but as a boy, his family moved to the Blackfeet Reservation in Browning, Montana.

He eventually moved back to Washington, obtaining a bachelor's degree in chemistry, while minoring in zoology. After dropping out of his first year in medical school, he migrated south, competing in boxing and motorcycle races.

In San Francisco, Ramus received coaching in drama and voice, eventually leading to work in commercials. Several years later, he moved to Los Angeles and picked roles in films and television.

== Career ==
Being of both Blackfoot and Greek ancestry, Ramus portrayed American Indian and Hispanic characters during his 30-year career.

Ramus' television debut was a role in the ABC series, The Wide World of Mystery (1973).

In television movies and miniseries, he appeared as Grey Cloud in Born to the Wind (1981), as Arapaho Chief Lost Eagle in Centennial (1978-1979), as Tehohane in The Chisholms (1980), and as Red Cloud in Son of the Morning Star (1991). Ramus also appeared as Mangus Colorado in the TNT film Geronimo (1993).

In television series, Ramus had a recurring role in the soap opera Falcon Crest as Gus Nunouz, and as Chief Black Kettle in Dr. Quinn, Medicine Woman. Guest appearances also included Gunsmoke, Harry and the Hendersons, Little House on the Prairie, MacGyver, Northern Exposure, Stingray, and Walker, Texas Ranger, among others.

On the big screen, Ramus' film debut was a role in Black Eye (1974). He would go on to star in the first Native American language film, Windwalker (1980). Other film roles include The Apple Dumpling Gang Rides Again (1979) as Indian Chief, Invasion U.S.A. (1985), Star Trek IV: The Voyage Home (1986) as Saratoga Helmsman, Love at Stake (1987) as Chief Wannatoka, Journey to Spirit Island (1992), and 3 Ninjas Knuckle Up (1995), among others.

In 2006, Ramus took the role as Local Guy in the independent short film, Alma (2007) featuring Carmen Corral (as Alma) who portrays a Mexican-immigrant teenager, unaware that she is undocumented. The film's executive producer was Victoria Westover, a program director for the Hanson Film Institute at the University of Arizona.

Ramus also wrote An Evening with Sitting Bull in the 1990s, from which he performed a one-man show.

== Personal life and death ==
Ramus married Harriet Mary Howard and had three children. He was remarried to Kaysie McCallister in 1995, and moved to the San Pedro River valley area, near Benson, Arizona in 2002. By that time he had retired, except for occasional appearances.

Ramus developed pneumonia in January 2007, and doctors found a neoplasm in his lungs. He opted out of surgery that could have potentially been debilitating. On May 30, 2007, Ramus died in Benson, Arizona at age 77.

== Filmography ==
=== Film ===
Year	Title	Role	Notes
1974	Black Eye		
1979	The Apple Dumpling Gang Rides Again	Indian Chief	
1980	Windwalker	Smiling Wolf / Crow Brother / Narrator	
1985	Invasion U.S.A.	Clark Little Hawk	
1986	Star Trek IV: The Voyage Home	Saratoga Helmsman	
1987	Love at Stake	Chief Wannatoka	
1988	Journey to Spirit Island	Tom	
1989	Caddie Woodlawn	Chief Tukenbheska	
1995	3 Ninjas Knuckle Up	Chief Roundcreek	
2006	The Treasure of Painted Forest	Mr. Godfrey	
2007	Alma	Local Guy	Independent Short Film
2007	Rapturious	Voice	Final film role

=== Television ===
Year	Title	Role	Notes
1973	The Wide World of Mystery		
1974	Gunsmoke	Lynit	Episode: "The Iron Blood of Courage"
1975	I Will Fight No More Forever	Rainbow	TV movie
1976	The Quest	Iron Hawk	TV movie
1977	Little House on the Prairie	Little Crow	Episode: "Freedom Flight"
1977	Walt Disney's Wonderful World of Color	Tioga	Episode: "Kit Carson and the Mountain Men: Parts 1 & 2"
1978–1979	Centennial	Lost Eagle	4 episodes
1979	The Chisholms	Tehohane	TV miniseries
1981–1982	Falcon Crest	Gus Nunouz	13 episodes
1982	The Legend of Walks Far Woman	Left Hand Bull	TV movie
1982	Born to the Wind	Grey Cloud	TV series
1982	The Mystic Warrior	Chief Olepi	TV movie
1985	Tall Tales & Legends	Sitting Bull	Episode: "Annie Oakley"
1987	Capitol	General Abdullah	Episode #1.1270
1987	Stingray	Alexander Bondy	Episode: "The Neniwa"
1989	Paradise	Chief Black Cloud	Episode: "The Burial Ground"
1989	Monsters	Temple Guide	Episode: "Half as Old as Time"
1990	Northern Exposure	Chief	Episode: "Soapy Sanderson"
1991	Harry and the Hendersons	Medicine Man	Episode: "Roots, The Herb"
1991	MacGyver	Standing Wolf	Episode: "Trail of Tears"
1993	Geronimo	Mangus Colorado	TV movie
1993–1995	Dr. Quinn, Medicine Woman	Chief Black Kettle	10 episodes
1995	Walker, Texas Ranger	Bright Water	Episode: "On Sacred Ground"
