= Stargate Infinity =

2002–2003 animated science fiction television series

- French: Stargate: Le Dessin Animé
- Genre: Adventure; Science fiction Drama; Science fantasy Military science fiction Action
- Created by: Eric Lewald; Michael Maliani
- Developed by: Mark Edward Edens; Michael Edens; Kaaren Lee Brown; Phil Harnage
- Directed by: Will Meugniot
- Starring: Mark Hildreth; Tifanie Christun; Bettina Bush; Kathleen Barr; Mackenzie Gray; Mark Acheson
- Theme music composer: Mike Piccirillo
- Opening theme: "Stargate Infinity"
- Ending theme: "Stargate Infinity" (Instrumental)
- Composers: Mike Piccirillo; Jean-Michel Guirao
- Countries of origin: France; United States
- Original language: English
- No. of seasons: 1
- No. of episodes: 26

Production
- Executive producers: Andy Heyward; Michael Maliani
- Running time: 22 minutes
- Production companies: Les Studios Tex S.A.R.L.; DIC Entertainment Corporation (Note: Animation outsourced to Hong Ying Animation.); MGM Television Entertainment

Original release
- Network: Fox (FoxBox) (U.S.); Disney Channel (France); M6 (France)
- Release: September 14, 2002 – March 24, 2003

From left to right: Stacey Bonner, Seattle Montoya, Gus Bonner, R.J. Harrison and Ec'co.

Stargate Infinity, often abbreviated as SGI or just Infinity or stylized as Stargåte Infinity (French: Stargate: Le Dessin Animé), is an animated science fiction television series co-produced by Les Studios Tex S.A.R.L. and DIC Entertainment Corporation, in association with MGM Television Entertainment as part of Metro-Goldwyn-Mayer's (MGM) Stargate franchise, but is not considered official Stargate canon. The show was created by Eric Lewald and Michael Maliani, as a spin-off series of Stargate SG-1, which was created by Brad Wright and Jonathan Glassner in 1997 after the release of the original film, Stargate (1994) by Dean Devlin and Roland Emmerich. The animation had a low viewership rating and poor reception; it was cancelled after just one season.

The story arc of Stargate Infinity follows Gus Bonner being framed for opening the Stargate for alien enemies in a future version of Stargate Command (SGC). Bonner escapes with a group of fresh recruits through the Stargate. The team cannot return to Earth before they have cleared their names. The show was cancelled before any of its major plots could be resolved. The story unfolds when the members of the team encounter different alien races from other planets.

== Series overview ==
The executive producers for the show were Andy Heyward and co-creator Michael Maliani. Will Meugniot was supervising director, and as of the series' cancellation, only three directors directed the 26-episode series. Mike Piccirillo wrote the music which he and Jean-Michel Guirao performed. The show often featured an educational comment or summary about the moral lessons learned during the course of an episode.

The writers and producers of Stargate SG-1 and the main canon of the Stargate franchise were not involved with Infinity, and neither MGM, the production teams nor the fans of Stargate consider Infinity to be an official part of the Stargate universe. According to Stargate SG-1 co-creator Brad Wright, the animated series should not be considered official Stargate canon, as he said that he was not involved in the production.

== Cast and characters ==
Stargate Infinity is set 30 years into the future and follows Gus Bonner and his team. Bonner's team was created after he was framed for a crime he did not commit. He escaped from Stargate Command (SGC) after the hostile alien race Tlak'kahn attacked the SGC to steal a mysterious alien chrysalis that was recently unearthed in Egypt. Together with his team, Gus escapes through the Stargate with the chrysalis. From that point forward they go visit planet to planet until they find the evidence to clear their names while learning about the unique cultures in the galaxy, so that they can one day return to Earth. The story arc was never resolved because of low viewership ratings and the show was cancelled in 2003.

- Gus Bonner (voiced by Dale Wilson) – a SG team veteran who was framed for disobeying orders and sending his men into an ambush, resulting in many of his soldiers dying or critically wounded. After the Tlak'kahn attack the facility, Gus escapes and leads a team of youngsters through the Gate to clear their names and prevent the Tlak'kahn from tormenting other sentient lives.
- Stacey Bonner (voiced by Tifanie Christun) – Gus Bonner's niece, an SGC recruit first seen in the Gate room when the hostile alien race Tlak'kahn attacks the SGC to find the chrysalis. She thinks Gus is a traitor for opening the Stargate for the Tlak'kahn, and frequent confronts him about it, despite his denying any involvement in it.
- Seattle Montoya (voiced by Bettina Bush) – a Native American who has different visions which helps the team to get out of harm's way. She has a telepathic connection with Draga, and could feel it when she is moved or in harm's way. She escaped with the others through the Stargate during the attack.
- R.J. Harrison (voiced by Mark Hildreth) – a sarcastic youngster who recently graduated from the academy and a member of Bonner's team. He escapes with him through the Stargate with the chrysalis in order to get it out of harm's way. He tends to flirt with any beautiful female being he sees and provides comic relief in the series.
- Draga (voiced by Kathleen Barr) – an alien newborn who emerges from the chrysalis. Draga is a being that is believed to have been an Ancient. She is born in the first episode and has strange, possibly unlimited powers over which she has little control. In one episode, the team visited a race of aliens who resembled her, but treated those of their race who couldn't fly like nonentities. She was given the chance to learn more, but realised she belonged with her friends. Draga is very curious and kind and often seems childlike in her innocence although this diminished noticeably throughout the series.
- Ec'co (voiced by Cusse Mankuma) – a friendly half-alien and an SGC cadet. He can fix anything with whatever is lying around. He joins the others to rescue the chrysalis. There are theories that he might in fact be the true Ancient, but due to the series cancelling before any real plot change occurred, this was never confirmed.
- Da'Kyll (voiced by Mark Acheson) – a violent alien commander who is the leader of the Tlak'kahn. He is allied to the shapeshifter Nephestis to capture alien creatures for reasons unknown. He obeys Nephestis's request to kill the Stargate crew in order to keep them from exposing both of their plans.
- Pahk'kal (voiced by Mackenzie Gray) – a Tlak'kahn warrior and subordinate to Da'Kyll.
- Nephestis (voiced by Lee Tockar) – a manipulative, treacherous shapeshifter who primarily takes the form of a Stargate high-ranking member by the name of Arnold Grimes. He is the one responsible for framing Gus Bonner of disobeying orders and leading his men to an ambush that killed them. He is also the one who closed the Stargate's access to Earth so that he could secure his plan, and sent Da'Kyll out to hunt them down.

== Broadcast ==
Stargate Infinity premiered in September 2002 as part of 4Kids Entertainment’s FoxBox Saturday morning line-up on Fox, where it aired until March 2003. The series would eventually be one of the launching programmes on the Syndicated DIC Kids Network E/I block, and would later air on the Cookie Jar Toons block on This TV until September 25, 2011.

In the show's home country of France, the series originally premiered on Disney Channel on March 8, 2003 and later aired on M6's M6 Kid block on August 30.

Metro-Goldwyn Mayer handles the rights of the show internationally (except in French territories), while WildBrain handles North America and French territories rights.

== Episodes ==
No.	Title	Directed by	Written by	Original release date	Prod. code
1	"Decision"	Will Meugniot	Mark Edens and Michael Edens	September 14, 2002	AP010-101
Having been unjustly court-martialed for defying orders and leading his team into ambush, Major Gus Bonner escapes through the Stargate with a team of young recruits to pursue the hostile Tlak'kahn race which framed him, and to clear his own name in the process. Meanwhile, R.J. Harrison learns that one should take responsibility for one's choices, no matter the consequences.
2	"Double Duty"	Will Meugniot	Mark Edens and Michael Edens	September 21, 2002	AP010-102
The Stargate leads Major Gus Bonner's strike-force to a planet inhabited by the Thorn, a race Major Bonner believes he might have unintentionally infected with a disease during a previous mission. Furthermore, his new team is faced with the hard decision of either placing their loyalty to Stargate Command or protecting what they believe to be an Ancient chrysalis from the evil Tlak'kahn.
3	"The Best World"	Will Meugniot	Len Uhley (teleplay), Mark Edens (story)	September 28, 2002	AP010-103
When exploring the mud-pit planet of the Mou'a'dash people, the team learns that appearances may be misleading and the mud-covered locals are not all they seem. Having shed its chrysalis form, the alien Draga takes effort to become part of the team. Stacey Bonner, however, still believes that Major Bonner is a traitor despite having saved Draga from the Tlak'kahn.
4	"Coming Home"	Will Meugniot	Jan Strnad	October 5, 2002	AP010-105
Not being fully accepted either on Earth or his mother's homeworld Hrath, the half-human, half-alien Ec'co strives to cope with his identity. Meanwhile, the Hrathi people assist Major Gus Bonner in uncovering the plot devised by the Tlak'kahn. He realises that a shapeshifter might have had something to do with his being framed for defying orders.
5	"Mentor"	Will Meugniot	Richard Mueller	October 12, 2002	AP010-106
When Major Bonner stumbles upon his long-lost mentor Harley Sheppard, his first impression is that the retired veteran helps the Mustari people prosper and provides them with culture and technology out of good will. Unfortunately, Major Bonner fails to see the flaws of his old hero and it is up to his team to convince him of the truth—that Sheppard uses his knowledge and authority to wield power over the locals.
6	"Hot Water"	Will Meugniot	Francis Moss, Ted Pedersen	October 19, 2002	AP010-108
Stranded on an ocean planet, the team is offered shelter by an alien settlement of great swimmers. Trouble begins when R.J. Harrison overestimates his own abilities and accepts the challenge to participate in a swimming contest which could turn out to be very dangerous, if not even deadly. Meanwhile, a pair of mercenaries offer their services to the evil Tlak'kahn in search for the presumed Ancient—Draga.
7	"Phobia"	Will Meugniot	Jon Loy	October 26, 2002	AP010-107
Driven by her arachnophobia, Stacey assaults a spider-like creature from a race which turns out to be both sentient and peaceful. Now, with the victim getting weaker with each minute, Stacey must stand trial for her actions. She must also overcome her fear of spiders, since they just became allies in the battle with the Tlak'kahn.
8	"Can I Keep It?"	Will Meugniot	Matt Edens	November 2, 2002	AP010-110
While the team explores a canyon planet, Seattle adopts a cute creature which turns out to be growing faster and faster with each day. However, this isn't the end of the team's problems—a probe just reported their whereabouts to the evil Tlak'kahn and the canyon is in danger of being flooded after a severe storm appears on the horizon.
9	"Who Are You?"	Will Meugniot	Katherine Lawrence	November 9, 2002	AP010-109
The team learns once more that appearances may be deceiving when faced with a group of Shiftu shapeshifters, just like those responsible for framing Major Gus Bonner. Unable to tell friend from foe, the team will have to rely on intuition to evade the shapeshifters and escape the jungle temple.
10	"Greed"	Will Meugniot	Richard Mueller	November 16, 2002	AP010-114
They are unaware when they discover a cave full of precious diamonds, that others will be searching them out such as mercenaries searching for Gus Bonner. Meanwhile, Draga learns an important lesson about money, wealth and greed.
11	"Stones"	Will Meugniot	Nick Dubois	November 23, 2002	AP010-111
Stacey loses a fight with an unseeming elder of the Alteri people, but she wins their respect and is given a stone medallion which is said to give the wearer strength. Unfortunately, the stones affect Stacey in ways she never imagined and she learns that nothing comes without a price.
12	"Initiation"	Will Meugniot	Steven Melching	November 30, 2002	AP010-112
When Harrison assists a volcano island native in his trial, he learns that there is a difference between foolishness and bravery. Meanwhile, Ec'co discovers that readings of seismic activity of the island Mollana show that the volcano is in danger of erupting or even exploding.
13	"The Mother of Invention"	Will Meugniot	Christy Marx and Randy Littlejohn	December 7, 2002	AP010-113
Major Bonner's team arrives at a world destroyed by its inhabitants. Kreeda, the inventor, attempts to save what's left of her civilisation—even if it means stealing and lying. Ec'co acquires a sympathy for her, but the next day the team finds their power sources stolen. Kreeda is the obvious suspect. She wishes to make up for her previous actions and warns the team about Tlak'kahn warriors nearby.
14	"Reality"	Will Meugniot	Katherine Lawrence	December 28, 2002	AP010-115
In a city endangered by solar flares and arc lightning, the Tranquan people spend their whole time in the Synth—a virtual reality game where everything is possible. Seattle and Major Bonner enter the Synth to free the enslaved Tranquan, but when the game starts granting their own wishes, they must to try to resist it.
15	"Museum"	Will Meugniot	Brooks Wachtel	January 4, 2003	AP010-116
The team learns a lesson about the importance of knowing one's history when they are trapped between two megalomaniacs—Napoleon Bonaparte and Julius Caesar. In a museum of Earth's greatest historical wonders, two armies of robots fight for world conquest. It's up to Major Gus Bonner and his knowledge of history to become a third force in this struggle.
16	"Us and Them"	Will Meugniot	Julia Jane Lewald	January 11, 2003	AP010-117
When Draga meets her own people, she is happy she can finally learn about her culture and abilities. The team, however, is regarded as mere "rock-crawlers", as no other team-member except Draga has wings. Draga finds herself divided between her team and her own people. She has little time to make a decision, because the Tlak'Kahn are already through the Stargate and on pursuit of Major Bonner.
17	"The Face of Evil"	Will Meugniot	Jon Loy	January 18, 2003	AP010-118
The Stargate leads Major Bonner's team to an ice planet with two hostile forces fighting each other. At first the team's only concern is to stay out of the way, but when it turns out that one of the armies are the Tlak'kahn, choosing sides becomes obvious—perhaps too obvious. Having taken shelter in an ice fortress, the newly-formed alliance prepares for battle.
18	"The Key"	Will Meugniot	Richard Mueller	January 25, 2003	AP010-119
The society of the Commonality banned all writing, having considered it an outdated method of communication—only symbols and video are permitted. Ec'co's calculations prove that a comet is about to hit the Commonality's planet, but because the Commonality has no means to verify this warning, they choose to disregard it.
19	"Chariot of the Sun"	Will Meugniot	Katherine Lawrence	February 1, 2003	AP010-120
Having stumbled upon an alien spaceship near a Stargate, Major Bonner decides to try to get inside in search of an interstellar communications system able to contact Stargate Command. When the communications system fails to establish contact, Major Bonner decides to get back to Earth by ship—but the whole team will have to pay for stealing the spaceship instead.
20	"The Answer"	Will Meugniot	Katherine Lawrence	February 8, 2003	AP010-121
Major Bonner's team attends a science conference, where one of the scientists presents a brilliant invention—the Synaptic Telepathy Band. Not only does it enable mind-to-mind communication, it also connects the minds of every user, enabling everyone to read the thoughts of others. Some see it as means to achieve universal peace with no more lies and misunderstandings, but others believe this is too big an invasion of privacy. It's up to Major Bonner's group to get at the truth.
21	"The Look"	Will Meugniot	Bob Forward	February 15, 2003	AP010-122
The inhabitants of the planet the team arrives to pride themselves on their hairstyle—those who wish to be respected, or even noticed, must weave a certain type of leaves into their hair. Not everyone is able to afford them and some resort to obtaining them from their natural place of growth—the cave tunnels nearby. Though the caves are inhabited by dangerous creatures, Harrison, Seattle and Stacey decide to help.
22	"Feet of Clay"	Will Meugniot	Richard Mueller	February 22, 2003	AP010-123
The team discovers a village of Mardan aliens who suffer from a serious epidemic. They wish to be just like the Tlak'kahn, who are much better at coping with sickness. Ec'co offers to find a cure to their suffering, but instead, the Mardan side with the Tlak'kahn and turn against the team. Attempting to escape their captors, the team wonders about the benefits and downsides of trying to be like others.
23	"The Natural"	Will Meugniot	Mark Edward Edens	March 1, 2003	AP010-124
Having escaped a Tlak'Kahn ambush, the team arrives at a planet covered by sulphur clouds, uninhabitable except for high elevations. To cope with the troubles with transportation, Major Gus Bonner calls his old friends for help—the pterodactyl-like Heruun he'd met before. But when Harrison falls for his death into the sulphur clouds, he'll have to learn the difference between machine and animal to survive.
24	"Big Mistake"	Will Meugniot	Nick Dubois	March 8, 2003	AP010-125
On a desert planet with rain shortages, the team decides to help the Mortai people by locating an underground water source and building a well to help with irrigation. When Stacey finds a local power source underground, Seattle volunteers to investigate. Finding a mysterious crystal, she suddenly gets a flashback from her past—she sees her parents in a situation when her father would not admit to a mistake he had made.
25	"The Illustrated Stacey"	Will Meugniot	Craig Miller	March 15, 2003	AP010-126
When Gus Bonner and Harrison make fun of Stacey's predictable, by-the-book behavior, she decides to act "unpredictably" and asks the natives of the planet they're visiting to draw her a facial tattoo. Unfortunately, it turns out the tattoo is not simply painted on—it consists of living microbes, which start multiplying on Stacey's skin to unpredictable results.
26	"The Long Haul"	Will Meugniot	Michael Edens (teleplay), Mark Edward Edens (story)	March 22, 2003	AP010-127
After so many adventures, the team begins to wonder whether their mission has any further purpose. Some of the team members wish to go back to Earth, and when Draga activates the Stargate subconsciously, the team arrives in Mexico. Another Stargate had been found at a dig site founded by a rich philanthropist, von Gilder. Now, Gus Bonner has his chance to find the alien who framed him.

== Home releases ==
The Complete Series DVD cover.

In October 2003, Sterling Entertainment released a VHS/DVD called "The Adventure Begins", which contains the episodes "Decision", "Double Duty" and "The Best World", with "Who Are You?" as a DVD exclusive episode. The DVD was reissued by NCircle Entertainment in 2007. In May 2008, Shout! Factory released the complete series on a four-disc boxset, containing all 26 episodes and bonus features.

20th Century Fox Home Entertainment and MGM Home Entertainment released a DVD set on August 13, 2007 in the United Kingdom. This DVD, despite being called "Volume 1", contains all 26 episodes of the series, with English, Italian and German audio.

As of 2018, Stargate Infinity has yet to be released on DVD in Region 4, namely Oceania and Latin America.

The series was released onto Amazon Prime Video in some European territories in 2023 as part of MGM+.

== Reception ==
Due to its lack of popularity, the series went under the radar, and was cancelled before any of its story arcs could be resolved. The show was of low budget, which was constantly noted by the media.
