= Journey to Spirit Island =

- Home video cover
- Directed by: László Pal
- Screenplay by: Crane Webster
- Story by: Crane Webster; László Pal
- Produced by: Bruce Clark
- Starring: Bettina Bush; Brandon Douglas; Marie Antoinette Rodgers
- Cinematography: Vilmos Zsigmond
- Edited by: Bonnie Koehler
- Music by: Fred Myrow
- Production companies: Pal Productions; Seven Wonders Entertainment
- Release dates: October 9, 1988 (Mill Valley); 1992 (Disney Channel)
- Running time: 93 minutes
- Country: United States
- Language: English

Journey to Spirit Island is a 1988 American family adventure film directed by László Pal, and starring Bettina Bush, Brandon Douglas, Marie Antoinette Rodgers and Gabriel Damon. Set on the Olympic Peninsula and a nearby, unspoiled San Juan island, the film follows a young Native American girl, her brother, and their two new friends as they battle land developers determined to build a holiday resort on the sacred burial site known as Spirit Island.

The film premiered in 1988, but due to distribution issues it was not widely seen until airing on the Disney Channel in 1992. It won a Daytime Emmy Award for Outstanding Directing For A Children's Special (for Pal).

== Plot ==
Two brothers, Michael and Willie, are on vacation from Chicago to the San Juan Islands of Washington state, with a teenage Native American girl named Maria and her brother Klim. They plan to save Spirit Island to preserve their heritage, but a conflict arises regarding the development of tribal burial grounds. When her grandmother organizes a protest against desecrating their ancestors' sacred burial ground, Maria takes up the fight. The antagonists are land developers who aim to transform Spirit Island into a vacation resort.

== Cast ==
- Bettina Bush as Maria
- Brandon Douglas as Michael
- Marie Antoinette Rodgers as Jimmy Jim
- Gabriel Damon as Willie
- Tarek McCarthy as Klim
- Tony Acierto as Hawk
- Nick Ramus as Tom
- Atilla Gambasci as Phil
- Rod Gibbens as Peter Mackel
- Frank Salsedo as Hoots
- Skeeter Vaughan as Harry
- Edie Hottowe as Lucy

== Production ==
The film was the narrative directorial debut of Hungarian-born filmmaker Lázsló Pal, who had previously directed nature documentaries. It was shot on-location entirely on-location on the Olympic Peninsula and the San Juan Islands in Washington state, with cinematography by the Oscar-winning Vilmos Zsigmond.

== Release ==
The film premiered at the 1988 Mill Valley Film Festival, but failed to find distribution. It was not released widely in the United States until it aired on Disney Channel in 1992.

== Reception ==
=== Critical response ===
The TV Guide Reviewer of "Journey to Spirit Island" commented: "This film, beautifully photographed by topnotch cinematographer Vilmos Zsigmond, is good hearted family fare marred by a hopelessly naïve conclusion". The reviewer added: "...Ostensibly a lesson in environmental protection, respect for Native American culture and the exploitation of that culture by the 'white man', 'Journey to Spirit Island' negates what impact it might have had by making an Indian the villain and a white businessman the noble hero".

Hal Erickson for Allmovie, praised "the superlative photography by Vilmos Zsigmond."

In his review for the Radio Times, John Ferguson concluded: "The members of a largely unknown cast give winning performances, director László Pal expertly brings together the mystical and adventure elements of the tale and the rugged northern locations are gloriously captured by Zsigmond".

=== Accolades ===
Award	Year	Category	Nominee	Result
Daytime Emmy Award	1993	Outstanding Directing For A Children's Special	László Pal	Won
