= Charles V. Bush =

US Air Force officer and corporate executive

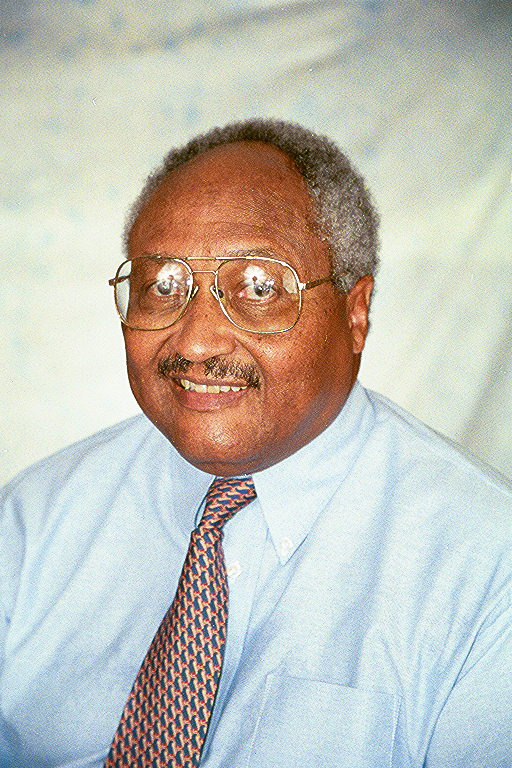
- Charles V. Bush.
- Born: Charles Vernon Bush; December 17, 1939
- Died: November 5, 2012 (aged 72); Montana, U.S.
- Children: Bettina Bush; Kyra Bush; Charles Bush
- Military career
- Allegiance: United States of America
- Branch: United States Air Force
- Service years: 1959–1970
- Rank: Major
- Conflicts: Vietnam War
- Awards: Bronze Star Medal; Joint Services Commendation Medal; Air Force Commendation Medal (2); Air Force Outstanding Unit Award

Charles Vernon Bush (December 17, 1939 – November 5, 2012) was an American civil rights activist, retired senior corporate executive and former U.S. Air Force officer. In 1954, at the urging of Chief Justice Earl Warren, who had asked for the appointment of an African-American page of the Supreme Court of the United States, Bush was selected as the first one by the court's marshal, T. Perry Lippitt. He was also one of the first three African-American Cadets to attend the U.S. Air Force Academy and the first African American to graduate from there.

== Family, early years and education ==
The son of Charles H. Bush, an administrator at Howard University, and his wife Marie, Bush grew up around Howard University's campus. He attended Banneker Jr. High School and Capitol Page School, a special high school for Congressional and Supreme Court pages. Prior to graduation from Capitol Page School, he competed on an examination, with 34 other candidates, for Washington, D.C.'s one nomination to the United States Air Force Academy (USAFA). He placed No. 2 on the exam and was designated the alternate nominee. He attended Howard University for two years, majoring in Electrical Engineering and was inducted into Alpha Phi Alpha fraternity.

As he was completing his sophomore year, he was contacted by James C. Evans about reapplying to USAFA with the assurance of receiving a nomination from Congressman William L. Dawson (D-IL). Evans served five Secretaries of War, ten Secretaries of Defense and six Presidents in his role of overseeing the integration of the U.S. Armed Forces.

Accepted for the USAFA Class of 1963 with his two African-American classmates, Bush reported as a Cadet in June 1959. He was a Squadron Commander, member of the USAFA Debate Team and a member of the Wing Champion Rugby Team. Having received academic course credits from Howard University, Bush was accepted into a special joint USAFA/Georgetown University Masters program, commencing with graduate courses in his senior year at USAFA, which included his oral comprehensives in the Russian language.

He graduated from USAFA with a Bachelor of Science. Bush received his Masters of Arts degree in International Relations from Georgetown University, in June 1964, and was inducted into the Georgetown chapter of Pi Sigma Alpha, the National Political Science Honor Society. Upon leaving the Air Force in 1970, he attended Harvard Business School, was co-chair of the African-American Student Union and was inducted into the Century Club in his second year. Bush received his Masters in Business Administration in Finance, in June 1972.

He married Bettina Wills in 1964. They have a son, Charles and two daughters, Kyra and Bettina Bush. They also have a granddaughter and seven grandsons.

== Military career ==
Following his commissioning in June 1963, Bush attended Georgetown University as a student, where he earned a Master of Arts degree in International Relations. He then attended Air Intelligence Officers School in Denver, Colorado, from March 1964 to November 1964. On completion of his air intelligence training, Bush was assigned to 8th Air Force Headquarters, Strategic Air Command, Westover Air Force Base, Massachusetts, as an intelligence officer, in November 1964. He was responsible for the briefing of the 8th Air Force Commander on strategic intelligence activities, specializing in Soviet political intelligence. While on this assignment, he taught undergraduate political science courses for American International College, as an Adjunct Assistant Professor. In 1966, he volunteered for an assignment to a special intelligence unit in Vietnam. For his service with 8th Air Force, Bush was awarded the Air Force Commendation Medal. In preparation for his Vietnamese assignment, he attended the Sanz Language School in Washington, D.C. under the auspices of the Defense Language Institute, in which he acquired fluency in the Vietnamese language. He also studied the Korean martial art Tae Kwon Do at Jhoon Rhee Studio in D.C., in 1966 - 1967.

Upon completion of his Vietnamese language training, Bush was assigned to the 6499th Special Activities Group, Tan Son Nhut Air Base, Saigon, Vietnam. From May 1967 to May 1968, as an intelligence officer, he was responsible for the deployment and operations of six intelligence teams composed of 10-15 officers and enlisted men, operating from Saigon, Bien Hoa, Nha Trang, Pleiku, Da Nang and Can Tho. The teams were involved with significant intelligence operations, particularly involving the attack on Tan Son Nhut Air Base during the Tet Offensive and the defense of the Marines and South Vietnamese at the Battle of Khe Sanh. Bush was awarded the Bronze Star by 7th Air Force and the Joint Services Commendation Medal by Military Assistance Command, Vietnam, for his service in-country. In November 1968, 6499th Special Activities Group was awarded the Air Force Outstanding Unit Award for meritorious service during the period July 1966 to June 1968.

Returning to the United States in May 1968, Bush was assigned to Headquarters Air Force Special Projects Production Facility, Westover Air Force Base, Massachusetts, as chief, Technical Analysis Division. He was responsible for image assessment studies leading to definitive objective evaluation techniques by which one could better assess and improve the photographic payload from reconnaissance satellites. He resumed teaching political science courses for American International College, as an Adjunct Assistant Professor. In May 1970, he resigned his commission, effective August 1970 and received an Honorable Discharge. Bush was awarded his second Air Force Commendation Medal by Headquarters Space and Missiles Systems Organization for meritorious service.

== Business career ==
Following his resignation from the Air Force, from August 1970 to June 1972 Bush attended Harvard Business School, majoring in Finance. Upon graduation, he worked as an investment banker with White Weld & Co., a Wall Street firm which later merged into the Merrill Lynch-White Weld Capital Group. As an investment banking associate, he provided the analysis for corporate financing, in public and private offerings of equity and debt, and advice relative to corporate mergers and acquisitions. From 1975 to 1978, Bush served as Assistant Treasurer, Financial Planning & Financing for Celanese Corporation, a fibers and chemicals manufacturer based in New York City.

In 1978, Bush was recruited to Max Factor, a cosmetics and fragrances manufacturer based in Hollywood, California, to serve as vice president, Treasurer, responsible for financial management and financing for its entities in 35 countries. In 1981, he transitioned to vice president, Corporate Controller, responsible for worldwide financial control. In 1983, he joined ICN Pharmaceuticals, Inc., currently named Valeant Pharmaceuticals International, an international manufacturer and distributor of pharmaceutical and research chemical products in Covina, California, for two years. In 1985, he accepted a position managing Greenberg, Glusker, Fields, Claman & Machtinger, located in Century City, California, as executive director. He was responsible for the general management of a 60-attorney law firm engaged in a general civil practice.

From 1987 to 1993, Bush was involved with an entrepreneur in a number of affiliated companies, involved in the infancy of the cellular telephone and cable television network businesses. Among those businesses, Bush was President of Marnel Investment Corp. located in Los Angeles, California, a boutique merchant banking firm specializing in cellular telephone and cable television network businesses. He also served as president and Chief Operating Officer and member of the Executive Committee, Board of Directors for ALN, formerly The Nostalgia Network, Inc., a cable television network which offered active adult Americans, the 45 plus age group, a variety of lifestyle, entertainment and informational programming via satellite to cable television systems in the U.S.

In 1994, Bush joined Hughes Electronics, as vice president, Business Development and Senior Vice President, Hughes International. His responsibilities included: Market Planning, Market Research, Customer Satisfaction, International Licensing, International Sales Representatives and Consultants, and International Operations Staff.

From 1996 to 2001, Bush pursued business as a Financial Consultant, while launching, as President & Chief Executive Officer, FONES4ALL, a startup competitive local exchange carrier (CLEC) providing local, prepaid long distance and internet services to residential markets. He transitioned management to a family member and joined an internet startup Traffic Station, Inc., which provided personalized, real-time traffic information and traffic alerts in 30 major metropolitan markets via pagers, internet telephone and wireless devices. He retired from this venture but continued to serve as a Financial Consultant.

=== Awards and Organizations ===
At his 40th USAFA Class Reunion, the USAFA African-American graduates, the USAFA Class of 1963 and USAFA presented Bush with the Pathfinder Award, in recognition of his role in paving the path for minorities.

At the Inaugural Black Service Academy Graduates Super Reunion, in August 2010, the Black Service Academy Graduates presented Bush with the Trailblazer Award, as the most senior living USAFA Black graduate.

Bush has served as a member of the Board of Directors of Mutual Life Insurance Co., the American Montessori Society, and the International Executive Council of the Harvard Business School Alumni Association, three years as a Member and three years as a vice president.

He is a founding member of the Harvard Business School African-American Alumni Association, a member of the Alpha Phi Alpha fraternity, a member of Pi Sigma Alpha, the National Political Science Honor Society and a member of the Century Club of Harvard Business School. He is also a member of the Financial Executives International Diversity Task Force and a 30-year member of Financial Executives International.

Bush is a member of the Board of Directors of the Maecenas Fund, whose mission is to provide post high school scholarships to students of merit and need from under-performing high schools.

He is a Falcon Foundation Trustee. Falcon Foundation is committed to providing scholarships to those who seek Air Force Academy admission leading to careers as Air Force Officers.

He has been a Guest Lecturer to the U.S. Air Force Academy, Department of Management for a number of years. He has been a Diversity Consultant to the U.S. Air Force and the U.S. Air Force Academy. He holds the Bronze Star Medal, the Joint Services Commendation Medal and two Air Force Commendation Medals.

==== Papers ====
Co-authored: "A Lack of Diversity in the Department of Defense's Executive Corps", July 26, 2008, unpublished.

Co-authored: "Why Diversity Efforts in the Department of Defense and Intelligence Community Have Come Up Short" – Presented at 22nd USAFA Military History Symposium, September 28–30, 2009 and published as a chapter on Diversity in Attitudes Aren't Free: Thinking Deeply About Diversity in the U.S. Armed Forces by Air University Press, February 2010.

Co-authored: "Analysis of the Private Mortgage Insurance Industry", Research Paper, Harvard Business School, April, 1972, Unpublished.

Presented:"Diversity is a Leadership Issue" at U.S. Air Force Academy 18th Annual National Character & Leadership Symposium 2011, February 23–25. Bush shared the life passages that instilled in him a calling to dedicate himself to driving the transformation of the Armed Forces senior leadership into an entity that reflects the diversity of the forces it commands and of the nation it defends.

C.V. Bush: "The Convention People's Party of Ghana: Foundation for Democracy or Totalitarianism?" Dissertation, Georgetown University, June, 1964, Unpublished.

== Death ==
Bush died from colon cancer at his Montana home on November 5, 2012.

== See also ==
- List of African-American pioneers in desegregation of higher education
- Wesley A. Brown – first Black graduate of the U.S. Naval Academy
- Henry Ossian Flipper – first Black graduate of the U.S. Military Academy
