= Ronald M. Cohen =

American screenwriter

Ronald M. Cohen (December 23, 1939, Chicago, Illinois – April 21, 1998, Los Angeles, California) was a US American screenwriter and film producer.

His screenwriting career started in the 1960s and he studied film at New York University. His screenwriting career encompassed Blue (1968 film), the 1977 film Twilight's Last Gleaming and the 1984 TV series Call to Glory. In 1977 he wrote a script for the movie adaption of Lothar-Günther Buchheims novel Das Boot, but it was rejected by Buchheim. For his screenwriting for the Series American Dream he was nominated for an Emmy in 1981. His last finished work was the screenwriting for the successful 1997 TV film Last Stand at Saber River starring Tom Selleck.

He was in a relationship with actress Julie Adams.
