= Theodore Strauss =

American writer (1912–2009)

Theodore Strauss (December 27, 1912 – October 30, 2009) was an American writer and filmmaker.

== Biography ==
Strauss was born in Oklahoma on December 27, 1912. He worked in circulation at The New York Times in the 1930s.

His novel Night at Hogwallow (Little, Brown & Co.,1937) was received positively by The New York Times. Later he became the paper's "second-string film critic" (after Bosley Crowther). In 1944, he left The New York Times to work as a screenwriter at Paramount.

Strauss was known for his novel Moonrise (Viking, 1946). It was first published serially in a magazine and then adapted for the 1948 film of the same name.

He worked for Life magazine and in 1956 was named editor of Woman's Home Companion. He was also editorial director of Crowell-Collier. In 1957, he returned to the film industry in the eastern story department of 20th Century-Fox. Robert Goldstein named him executive story editor at Fox in 1960.

From the 1960s–1980s, he was known for television documentaries. Strauss and Terry Sanders won a Writers Guild of America Award for the film The Legend of Marilyn Monroe (1966). He was nominated for an Emmy for I Will Fight No More Forever (1975) and he won an Emmy for America Salutes Richard Rodgers: The Sound of His Music (1976).

Strauss narrated the first hour of Jacques Cousteau: Cries from the Deep (1982). A Variety review said it was "dismally narrated" and elaborated that his "high-toned verbiage" spoiled the trip for viewers.

A Variety review of his 1986 effort, Clue: Movies, Murder & Mystery, was critical: "Writer Theodore Strauss throws in so many subjects involved in fictional murder that the viewer is left wondering what the mystery is all about".

=== Personal life ===
Strauss was married to Catherine Morrison; they had a son, Eric.

Later Strauss married Dorothy Comingore from 1947 to 1952; they had a son, Peter. In 1956, Strauss married his third wife, Luann "Ludy" Miller, in Connecticut; they had a son, Jonathan, around 1960.

Theodore Strauss died on October 30, 2009.

== Novels ==
- Night at Hogwallow (Little, Brown & Co., 1937); also published under the title The Haters
- Moonrise (Viking, 1946)

== Selected filmography ==
=== Film ===
- Moonrise (1948)
- Isn't It Romantic? (1948)
- The Russian Story (1948)
- Four Days in November (1964)

=== Television ===
- The Way Out Men (television) (1965)
- They've Killed President Lincoln (1971)
- The Crucifixion of Jesus (1972)
- The Killer Instinct (1973)
- Struggle for Survival (1974)
- I Will Fight No More Forever (1975)
- America Salutes Richard Rodgers: The Sound of His Music (1976)
- Jacques Cousteau: Cries from the Deep (1982)
- Honeymooners Reunion (1985)
- Clue: Movies, Murder & Mystery (1986)
