= Emilio Delgado =

American actor (1940–2022)

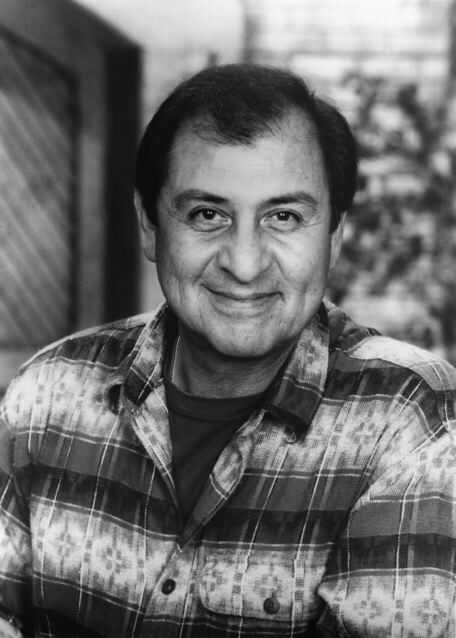
- Delgado as Luis on Sesame Street
- Born: Emilio Ernest Delgado; May 8, 1940; Calexico, California, U.S.
- Died: March 10, 2022 (aged 81); New York City, U.S.
- Occupation: Actor
- Years active: 1968–2022
- Television: Sesame Street
- Spouses: Barbara Snavely (m. 1963; div. 1975) Linda Moon (m. 1977; div. 1984) Carole Delgado (m. 1990)
- Children: 2

Emilio Ernest Delgado (May 8, 1940 – March 10, 2022) was an American actor best known for his role as Luis, the Fix-it Shop owner, on the children's television series Sesame Street. He joined the cast of Sesame Street in 1971 and remained until his contract was not renewed, in late 2016, as part of Sesame Workshop's retooling of the series.

Following his departure, the workshop stated that Delgado would continue to represent them at public events. Delgado also appeared as Luis in the TV special Sesame Street's 50th Anniversary Celebration. He began his professional career in Los Angeles in 1968. Delgado lived in New York City with his wife Carole Delgado.

== Life and career ==
=== Childhood, education and early roles ===
Delgado was born in Calexico, California, to Emilio Delgado and Carmen Rodriguez Delgado on May 8, 1940.

He was raised in his grandparents' house in Mexicali, Mexico, with his extended family, during part of his childhood. As a citizen of the United States, he would walk daily to attend a public school in Calexico. He began working odd jobs as a ten-year-old and at his uncle's bicycle shop at age 12. His family moved to Glendale, California, when he was a teenager. During high school, three years of which he attended Glendale High School, he became president of the Thespian Club; he played the trombone in the jazz band and he was a drum major in the marching band. He played very low notes on the viola in the classical symphony orchestra, he also played acoustic guitar from his early teens throughout his lifetime, playing in folk groups during the 1960s and his 44 years on Sesame Street.

Delgado was "adamantly and morally opposed" to the Vietnam War, but enlisted in the California Army National Guard for six years, serving domestically. A supply corporal, Delgado was deployed to the Watts riots in Los Angeles, in 1965, where he was "astonished to see weekend warriors being issued live ammunition to use against other Americans."

Delgado began acting professionally in 1968, after nine years of "trying to knock doors down in Los Angeles to get in." That year, he received his first Equity job in a summer stock play starring Martha Raye, and later he was cast in the first Mexican-American soap opera, Cancion de la Raza.

Befriending actor Sergei Tschernisch at Los Angeles theatre company Inner City Repertory, Delgado learned of the new theatre program at CalArts, led by Provost Herb Blau. While already a professional actor as of his 1970 enrollment, Delgado praised Blau's methods, suggesting his avant-garde method was "amazing."

As of 1970, he was the artistic director of the new Mexican-American Centre of Creative Arts, which taught Chicano high school and college students from the basement of the Euclid Heights Community Centre in East Los Angeles. Delgado told the Los Angeles Times: "We are 100% positive in our approach, and we are uncompromising in our belief that our kids will come away thinking of themselves as artists. Nothing is going to stop us from attaining our identification in American society."

Delgado had a guest role in an October 1970 episode Storefront Lawyers before being cast as a series regular in Angie's Garage in November 1970. The new children's series focused on serving Mexican-American children. He was billed as a singer-guitarist. He speculated that Sesame Street producers discovered him through the series.

Delgado recorded voice-over work in both English and Spanish.

=== Early years on Sesame Street (1971–1988) ===
On Sesame Street, his character Luis, along with Raul Julia as Rafael, were the first human additions to the original cast. Luis was a handyman, and an aspiring writer, who debuted on the show in 1971 simultaneously with Julia. Together they ran the L&R Fix-It Shop until Julia left the show after one season, and Luis ran the Fix-It Shop alone from then on.

The enormous popularity of Sesame Street created a barrage of groups providing input on the curriculum in its second season. During the season, the program attempted to teach Spanish to children whose mother tongue was English. Producer Jon Stone told The Pittsburgh Press that their attempts were "a disaster. It was tokenism at best, and condescension at worst." For the third season, the show rebooted their efforts, adding Puerto Ricans and Chicanos, and creating new Spanish segments. Seven new cast members were added at the start of the season, including Delgado, Panchito Gómez, Raul Julia, and Sonia Manzano. Delgado was still enrolled at CalArts when he was cast. The character has been described as the "antithesis" of the Mexican and Latino stereotypes that proliferated television at the time, as he was "an honest, upstanding, hard-working, affable person." Delgado expected the role to last one or two seasons.

Delgado joined the series' live events by at least 1972, when he performed with the Jackson Symphony Orchestra.

Delgado was named the coordinator of the Children's Television Workshop's Bilingual Task Force, and he was sent across the country to meet with groups. The efforts were to lead to further updates to content in season 4. He commented in 1972 that the series didn't "teach Spanish, we teach in Spanish."

Delgado is believed to have played "the same role on American television longer than any other Mexican-American actor," according to CalArts.

=== Later seasons on Sesame Street (1988–2016) ===
During Sesame Street's 19th season, first aired in 1988, Luis fell in love with Maria, played by Sonia Manzano, and married her. The characters Luis and Maria taught viewers about Hispanic culture and language throughout their shared run of the show. According to Delgado, "to this day, there are fans out there who want to believe that the Luis and Maria wedding episode in 1988 was real, but the fact of the matter is, it was just terrific acting."

Delgado later appeared at various pop culture conventions, often under the brand "Humans of Sesame Street". Delgado also reprised the role of Luis in the TV special Sesame Street's 50th Anniversary Celebration.

Delgado also performed in live shows throughout his Sesame Street career, singing the songs of Sesame Street and entertaining thousands of children and their families.

=== Additional roles ===
Delgado took guest roles on other series while Sesame Street was not taping. Notably, he had a recurring role as national news editor Rubin Castillo on the television series Lou Grant.

Delgado starred in Quixote Nuevo that premiered in 2018 at CalShakes Theater in Berkeley, California, then went on tour in 2019 to Hartford Stage in Connecticut, Boston's Huntington Theatre and Houston's Alley Theatre production (2020) of Octavio Solis, a modern Chicano adaptation of Don Quixote.

In Los Angeles, he was a company member of Inner City Rep, The Group Repertory, and LA Repertory. Some of his New York City theatre credits include Floating Home (HExTC), Boxing 2000 (Richard Maxwell NYC Players), Dismiss All the Poets (New York Fringe Festival 2002), Nilo Cruz's adaptation of A Very Old Man with Enormous Wings Shakespeare Theatre of New Jersey, Dinosaurios (IATI), Night Over Taos INTAR Theatre an adaptation How the García Girls Lost Their Accents Round House Theatre and Emilio appeared in the role of King Claudius in Asolo Repertory Theatre production of Hamlet, Prince of Cuba, with alternating performances in English and Spanish, where one reviewer wrote that Delgado "is equally brilliant as King Claudius".

His other television appearances include House of Cards, Law & Order, Law & Order: Criminal Intent, and Law & Order: Special Victims Unit. He was a regular cast member of Lou Grant and the short-lived Born to the Wind. He also appeared in episodes of Police Story; Hawaii Five-O; and Quincy, M.E.

Delgado's other creative endeavor was to sing and record with the band Pink Martini. He performed with the band at Carnegie Hall and Town Hall in New York City, The Hollywood Bowl in Los Angeles, in Woodinville, Washington at the Chateau Ste. Michelle Winery, and in Portland, Oregon at the Arlene Schnitzer Concert Hall, Crystal Ballroom and the Oregon Zoo. He appears on their album Splendor in the Grass, in which he recorded the song "Sing", a duet with China Forbes.

In the latter years of his life, just before his death, he also served on the board of directors at the Bayard Rustin Center for Social Justice, an LGBTQIA+ safe-space, community activist center, and educational bridge dedicated to honoring Bayard Rustin through their mission and good works.

== Personal life and death ==
Emilio and Carole were married in Bermuda, January 28, 1990. Delgado has a daughter, Lauren, and a son, Aram Delgado, from his previous marriage, who died on December 28, 2023. He has one grandson, Eladio Delgado.

Delgado's voice has been described as "deep, smooth and sonorous, his words precise and deliberate."

In December 2020, Delgado was diagnosed with multiple myeloma. He died from the disease at his home in Manhattan, New York City, on March 10, 2022, at the age of 81.

=== Recognitions ===
Delgado received The Impact Award from the National Hispanic Media Coalition, The HOLA Ilka Award, and the Keys to the cities of Evansville and Omaha.

== Filmography ==
=== Film ===
- I Will Fight No More Forever - TV movie - Ollokot (1975)
- Born to the Wind - White Bull (1982)
- Sesame Street Presents: Follow That Bird - Luis Rodriguez (1985)
- Reggie's Prayer - Stadium Announcer (1996)
- The Adventures of Elmo in Grouchland - Luis Rodriguez (1999)
- Perhaps Tomorrow - Zelgai (2010)
- A Case of You - Roberto (2013)
- Peeples - Chief Oneka (2013)
- Montauk - Eduardo (2013)
- Luz Marina - Carlos (2018)
- iGilbert - Rodolfo Gonzalez (2021)
- Street Gang: How We Got to Sesame Street - Self (2021)

=== Television ===
- Storefront Lawyers - episode - Survivors Will Be Prosecuted - Cadena (1970)
- Sesame Street - Luis Rodriguez (1971–2016, 2019)
- Cannon - episode - Cry Wolf - Dr. Guiterrez (1976)
- Police Story - episode - Spanish Class - Agitator #1 (1976)
- Delvecchio - episode - The High Price of Justice - Attorney (1977)
- Hawaii Five-O - episode - The Ninth Step - Vic Salazar (1977)
- ABC Weekend Specials - episode - Tales of the Nunundaga - White Bull (1977)
- The Chisholms - TV Mini-Series - Native Trader (1979)
- Lou Grant - 19 episodes - Rubin Castillo (1979–1982)
- Quincy, M.E. - episode - Welcome to Paradise Palms - Felix Wanaka (1980)
- Born to the Wind - White Bull (1981)
- Quincy, M.E. - episode - D.U.I. - Officer Garcia (1981)
- Falcon Crest - episode - Unaired Pilot - Fernando Diaz (1982)
- Falcon Crest - episode - Lord of the Manor - Paul (1982)
- The 10th Annual People's Choice Awards - TV Special - Himself - Accepting Award from Favourite Children's Program (1984)
- Learning About Letters - Sesame Street Video short - Luis Rodriguez (1986)
- Sing Along - Sesame Street Video short - Luis Rodriguez (1987)
- Sesame Street, Special - TV Movie - Luis Rodriguez (1988)
- Sesame Street: 20 and Still Counting - TV Special - Himself/Luis Rodriguez (1989)
- Sing Yourself Silly! - Sesame Street Video short - Luis Rodriguez (1990)
- Sesame Street Home Video Visits the Hospital - Sesame Street Video short - Luis Rodriguez (1990)
- Sesame Street Stays Up Late! - TV Special - Himself/Luis Rodriguez (1993)
- All-Star 25th Birthday: Stars and Street Forever! - Sesame Street TV Movie - Luis Rodriguez (1994)
- Elmo Saves Christmas - Video - Luis Rodriguez (1996)
- Learn Along with Sesame - episodes - Lead Away, and For Me, For You, For Latter (1996–2011)
- Elmopalooza! - TV Special - Himself/Luis Rodriguez (1998)
- Sesame Street 'A Is for Asthma' - Sesame Street Video short - Luis Rodriguez (1998)
- Cosby - episode - It's a Wonderful Wife (2000)
- Between the Lions - episode - The Ram in the Pepper Patch - The Ram (voice) (2000)
- Law & Order - episode - Surrender Dorothy - Elias Soriano (2000)
- Sesame Street: Three Bears and a New Baby - Video - Luis Rodriguez (2003)
- Law & Order: Criminal Intent - episode - Pas de Deux - Ari Hernandez (2004)
- Sesame Street Presents: The Street We Live On - TV Movie - Luis Rodriguez (2004)
- Sesame Street: Friends to the Rescue - Video - Luis Rodriguez (2005)
- Guess That Shape and Color - Sesame Street Video short - Luis Rodriguez (2006)
- Law & Order: Criminal Intent - episode - Amends - Rodolfo Delgado (2007)
- Ready for School - Sesame Street Video - Luis Rodriguez (2007)
- Law & Order: Special Victims Unit - episode - Inconceivable - Enrique Diaz (2008)
- Late Night with Jimmy Fallon - 1 episode - Don Enrique
- Cupid - episode - Live and Let Spy - Gus (2009)
- The 36th Annual Daytime Emmy Awards - TV Special - Himself (uncredited) (2009)
- Person of Interest - episode - Pilot - Detective Padilla (uncredited) (2011)
- Dora the Explorer - episode - The Big Red Chicken's Magic Wand - Merlín (voice) (2012)
- Sesame Street: Fairy Tale Fun! - Video - Luis Rodriguez (2013)
- Little Children, Big Challenges - episode - Incarceration - Luis Rodriguez (2013)
- The Michael J. Fox Show - episode - Couples - Flower Vendor (2014)
- I Am Big Bird: The Caroll Spinney Story - Documentary - Himself (2014)
- House of Cards - episode - Chapter 33 - Ambassador Davila (2015)
- The Get Down - 1 episode - Minister Ruiz (2017)
- Dora the Explorer - episode - Dora's Animalito Adventure - Copal Tree (voice) (2019)
- The Bravest Knight - 3 episodes - The King (voice) (2019)
- Sesame Street's 50th Anniversary Celebration - TV special - Luis Rodriguez (2019)
- Law & Order: Special Victims Unit episode "Turn Me on Take Me Private" as Aaron Carrera (2021)

=== Video games ===
- Let's Learn to Play Together - Luis Rodriguez (1988)
- Red Dead Revolver - Bandits #3, D-Troopers #1 (2004)
- Red Dead Redemption 2 - Del Lobos, The Local Pedestrian Population (2018)
- Red Dead Online - Alfredo Montez (2019)

== See also ==
- List of California Institute of the Arts people
