= The Quest (1976 TV series) =

- Series title screen
- Genre: Western
- Created by: Tracy Keenan Wynn
- Written by: Anthony Lawrence; Michael Michaelian; Katharyn Powers; Tracy Keenan Wynn
- Directed by: Bernard McEveety
- Starring: Kurt Russell; Tim Matheson
- Theme music composer: Richard Shores
- Composer: Richard Shores
- Country of origin: United States
- Original language: English
- No. of seasons: 1
- No. of episodes: 15 (4 unaired)

Production
- Executive producer: David Gerber
- Producers: James H. Brown; Mark Rodgers
- Cinematography: Al Francis
- Editors: Hugh Chaloupka; John Elias; Richard L. Van Enger; Ken Zemke
- Camera setup: Single-camera
- Running time: 44 mins.
- Production companies: David Gerber Productions; Columbia Pictures Television

Original release
- Network: NBC
- Release: September 22 – December 29, 1976

Related
- The Quest

The Quest is an American Western television series which aired on NBC from September to December 1976. The series stars Kurt Russell and Tim Matheson. The pilot episode aired as a television movie on May 13, 1976.

== Overview ==
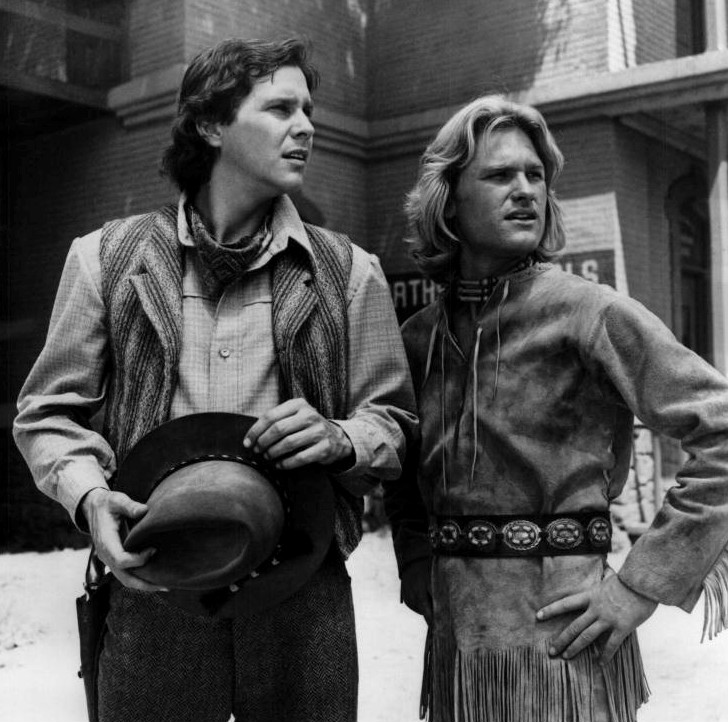
Tim Matheson and Kurt Russell

Two brothers Morgan and Quentin Beaudine are seeking the whereabouts of their long-lost sister, Patricia, thought to be held by the Cheyenne. The siblings were separated after their parents were killed during an "Indian massacre". Morgan, known as "Two Persons", was a captive of the Cheyenne for eight years until he was freed by the United States Army. Quentin was taken to San Francisco, where he was educated as a physician.

After their reunion, the pair journey together over thousands of miles across the Great Plains and the Rocky Mountains in search of Patricia; hence, the title The Quest.

== Cast ==
=== Main ===
- Kurt Russell as Morgan "Two Persons" Beaudine
- Tim Matheson as Quinton Beaudine
- Brian Keith as "Tank" Logan
- Keenan Wynn as H.H. Small

=== Guest actors ===
- John Anderson
- Rayford Barnes
- Bibi Besch
- Neville Brand
- Susan Dey
- Erik Estrada
- I. Stanford Jolley
- Gary Lockwood
- Pamela Sue Martin
- Don Meredith
- Hal Miller
- Cameron Mitchell
- Read Morgan
- Judson Pratt
- Pernell Roberts
- Laraine Stephens
- Morgan Woodward
- Cheryl Smith Unaired Episode 14

== Episodes ==
A pilot movie aired on May 13, 1976 as a preview of the upcoming series; it received strong ratings, placing in the top 20 programs for the week. The first regular series episode was broadcast on September 22 with an extended 90 minute runtime to recap events from the pilot.

The Quest aired at the 9/10 p.m. Wednesday timeslot, deliberately targeting an adult audience after the failure of the family-oriented western Sara earlier in 1976. It ran opposite Charlie's Angels on ABC, also debuting that fall, and The Blue Knight on CBS.

=== Pilot: 1975 ===
Pilot for the 1976 television series The Quest
No.	Title	Directed by	Written by	Original release date
0	"The Quest"	Lee H. Katzin	Tracy Keenan Wynn	May 13, 1976
Two brothers, one raised in the city and the other by Indians, are searching the Old West for their sister with the assistance of a former gunslinger-turned-cattle rustler. Guest stars: John Anderson, Brian Keith, Keenan Wynn, Will Hutchins, Neville Brand, and Cameron Mitchell.

=== Season 1: 1976 ===
List of episodes of the 1976 television series The Quest
No.	Title	Directed by	Written by	Original release date
1	"The Captive"	Barry Shear	Mark Rogers	September 22, 1976
After eight years apart, the Beaudine brothers embark on the quest to find their sister, who they believe is held captive by the Cheyenne; they accompany an Army raid on an Indian village to rescue a young white woman. Guest starring Bibi Besch, Dennis Cole, Christopher Connelly, Susan Dey, Royal Dano, Richard Egan, and Russ Tamblyn.
2	"The Buffalo Hunters"	Earl Bellamy	Paul Savage	September 29, 1976
The Beaudines are taken captive by buffalo hunters while rescuing a native woman. Guest starring Alex Cord, John Quade, and Linda Redfearn.
3	"Shanklin"	Corey Allen	Charles A. McDaniel	October 13, 1976
Texas Ranger Shanklin is assisted by the brothers in pursuing a gang of murdering rapists into Mexico. Guest starring John Anderson, Mariette Hartley, and Don Meredith.
4	"Day of Outrage"	Bernard McEveety	Frank Telford	October 27, 1976
The Beaudines seek shelter from a storm with Cattle Kate, played by Amanda Blake. Also guest starring Don "Red" Barry, Severn Darden, George Gaynes, Steve Kanaly, James Keach, Lance Kerwin, Pamela Sue Martin, and Don Matheson.
5	"Seventy-Two Hours"	Alf Kjellin	Anthony Lawrence	November 3, 1976
Tragedy ensues after a local marshal allows cattle drovers to run wild. Guest starring Maria Elena Cordero, Howard Keel, Cameron Mitchell, Aldo Ray, and Mitch Vogel.
6	"Prairie Woman"	Bernard McEveety	Earl W. Wallace	November 10, 1976
The Beaudines are forced to make a tough choice after encountering a woman and her sick child. Guest starring Jim Davis, Ty Hardin, and Laraine Stephens.
7	"Welcome to America, Jade Snow"	Bernard McEveety	Anthony Lawrence	November 24, 1976
The Beaudines work to defuse a tense situation after Chinese workers are brought in to break a mine strike. Guest starring Gary Collins, George Lazenby, Irene Yah-Ling Sun, and Jason Wingreen.
8	"The Longest Drive: Part 1"	Bernard McEveety	Katharyn Powers and Michael Michaelian	December 1, 1976
The Beaudine brothers help a rancher muster a crew of cattle drovers.
9	"The Longest Drive: Part 2"	Bernard McEveety	Katharyn Powers, Michael Michaelian and Tracy Keenan Wynn	December 8, 1976
A determined rancher keeps pushing a cattle drive despite numerous setbacks. Guest starring Dan O'Herlihy, Keenan Wynn, Woody Strode, Erik Estrada, and John Rubinstein.
10	"Portrait of a Gunfighter"	Jerry London	Ron Bishop	December 22, 1976
After Quentin teaches an orphan how to use a gun in self-defense, the boy turns into a cold-blooded gunfighter. Guest starring Morgan Brittany, Jack Colvin, John Ireland, and Andrew Stevens.
11	"The Freight Train Rescue"	Michael O'Herlihy	Sean Baine	December 29, 1976
The Beaudines team up with Nelson Story to rescue government surveyors. Guest starring Monte Markham.
12	"The Last of the Mountain Men"	Barry Crane	Judy Burns and Jack Miller	Unaired
The Beaudines team up with two old trappers against a mountain man. Guest starring Leif Erickson, Douglas Fowley, and Pernell Roberts.
13	"Dynasty of Evil"	Bernard McEveety	William Putman	Unaired
A feud between homesteaders and a cattle baron entangles the Beaudines. Guest starring Howard Duff, Gary Graham, David Ladd, Joan Prather, and Robert J. Wilke.
14	"The Seminole Negro Indian Scouts"	Irving J. Moore	Dick Nelson	Unaired
The Beaudines help Black Seminole Scouts under attack from a racist sheriff. Guest starring Henry Brown, Hal Miller, Bill Overton, Stack Pierce, Bill Williams, and Cheryl Smith.
15	"Incident at Drucker's Tavern"	Bernard McEveety	Frank Telford	Unaired
The Beaudines are stranded in a town where a gambler and his pregnant wife are hiding from the father of a man killed by the gambler. Guest starring Julie Cobb, Scott Hylands, and Morgan Woodward.

== Background and production ==
=== Development ===
The series was created by Tracy Keenan Wynn, son of Keenan Wynn, who also made two appearances on the series. David Gerber served as the executive producer. Gerber intended to duplicate the "gritty realism, ... attention to detail, character and authenticity" of Police Story in the first prime time western since the end of Gunsmoke. It was the only western scheduled for the upcoming fall 1976 television season.

=== Filming ===
Much of the filming was in Arizona.

=== Cancellation ===
Consistently low ratings, coupled with the fact that Westerns had fallen out of favor with networks and audiences, contributed to the demise of the series. NBC confirmed reports that The Quest had been canceled during its first season on December 7, 1976, and the final episode aired on December 29, 1976. Four of the fifteen episodes produced never aired in the US.

== Release ==
=== Home media ===
While the entire series has not been released on DVD, a two-part episode, "The Longest Drive", was released on Region 1 DVD by Sony Pictures Home Entertainment in 2005. The television film which served as the series' pilot episode was also released on DVD by Sony in 2011.

=== Syndication ===
As of February 2021, The Quest airs on the classic TV network Get TV on Sunday afternoons, including the four episodes that were not originally aired. Its two-part episode, "The Longest Drive" is currently available for streaming online on Tubi.

== Reception ==
David Eden, reviewing the series for the Albuquerque Journal, compared the chemistry between Russell and Matheson to Starsky and Hutch and praised the acting, script, and production, but concluded the series was not refreshing because it repeated "too many tired story lines from old Westerns".

=== Awards ===
Grady Hunt was nominated for the 1977 prime time Emmy Award in costume design for a drama or comedy series for his work on The Quest.

One episode, "Hatcher's Drive" won a Spur Award in 1976 from the Western Writers of America for script writers Katharyn Powers and Michael Michaelian. The writers tied with "The Macahans" by Jim Byrnes for How the West Was Won on ABC.

== See also ==
- The Searchers
