= Born to the Wind =

American drama television series

- Genre: Drama
- Directed by: Charles S. Dubin; Philip Leacock; I.C. Rapoport
- Country of origin: United States
- Original language: English

Production
- Producer: I.C. Rapoport
- Running time: 60 minutes

Original release
- Network: NBC
- Release: August 19 – September 5, 1982

Born to the Wind is an American drama television series that aired on NBC from August 19 to September 5, 1982. The series was filmed in Arizona in 1978, was originally titled Indians, and was set in about 1803. It had been planned to become a weekly series, but was shelved for four years before finally being broadcast.

== Synopsis ==
The series centered on a small Native American tribe in an unnamed part of North America before the arrival of white settlers. They face challenges both from nature and members within the tribe. Painted Bear was their leader, who was married to Prairie Woman; Star Fire was their daughter, and Two Hawks their son. One Feather was the tribal medicine man, Low Wolf and White Bull were prominently featured in the series.

== Cast ==
- Will Sampson as Painted Bear
- A Martinez as Low Wolf
- Henry Darrow as Lost Robe
- Rose Portillo as Star Fire
- Dehl Berti as One Feather
- Emilio Delgado as White Bull
- Linda Redfearn as Prairie Woman
- Guillermo San Juan as Two Hawks
- Ned Romero as Broken Foot
- Cynthia Avila as Arrow Woman

- Sandra Griego as Red Stone
- Claudio Martínez as Night Eyes
- Manu Tupou as Cold Maker
- Silvana Gallardo as Digger Woman
- Nick Ramus as Grey Cloud
- James Cromwell as Fish Belly
- Rudy Diaz as Red Leggins
- Geraldine Keams as Wind Woman
- Eric Greene as Lame Elk
- Edwin Avedissian as Rocco Sage

== Episodes ==
No.	Title	Directed by	Written by	Original release date
1	"Night Eyes"	Unknown	Unknown	August 19, 1982
Painted Bear must decide what to do with a wild boy, raised by wolves. The wolves surround and endanger the camp.
2	"Redstone's Son"	Unknown	Unknown	August 22, 1982
Painted Bear prepares to battle another tribe over who will have custody of an orphaned baby boy.
3	"He Who Chases the Enemy"	Unknown	Unknown	August 28, 1982
An old warrior asks Painted Bear to help rescue his wife, who had been captured by a hostile tribe.
4	"A Man Called Fishbelly"	Unknown	Unknown	September 5, 1982
Low Wolf returns to the camp with the first white man any member of the tribe had ever seen.
