= I Will Fight No More Forever =

1975 film

- Genre: Action; Drama; History; War; Western
- Written by: Jeb Rosebrook; Theodore Strauss
- Directed by: Richard T. Heffron
- Starring: James Whitmore; Ned Romero; Sam Elliott
- Theme music composer: Gerald Fried
- Country of origin: United States
- Original language: English

Production
- Executive producer: David L. Wolper
- Producer: Stan Margulies
- Cinematography: Jorge Stael
- Editor: Robert K. Lambert
- Running time: 105 minutes
- Production company: Wolper Productions

Original release
- Network: ABC
- Release: April 14, 1975

I Will Fight No More Forever is a 1975 made-for-television Western film starring James Whitmore as General Oliver O. Howard and Ned Romero as Chief Joseph. It is a dramatization of Chief Joseph's resistance to the U.S. government's forcible removal of his Nez Perce Indian tribe to a reservation in Idaho.

== Plot ==
Set in 1877, the story follows Chief Joseph of the Nez Perce tribe, who lived in the border area of Idaho and Oregon. As President Ulysses S. Grant permits white settlers to come to both territories, the native Nez Perce fight back and defy the order from Grant to leave their home ground. The U.S. Army, commanded by General Oliver Howard (a Civil War Veteran) is then sent out to push the tribe out, leading to war. The fight between whites (both soldiers and settlers) and tribe members increases, leading Joseph to try for an escape to Canada, but deep down he fears a long, costly fight with a tough enemy. As he says to one member of the tribe who killed a white man for another tribe member's murder on the eve of war, "You have had your revenge. Now the white man will have his".

== Cast ==
- James Whitmore as General Oliver O. Howard
- Ned Romero as Chief Joseph
- Sam Elliott as Captain Wood
- John Kauffman as Wahlitits
- Emilio Delgado as Ollokot
- Nick Ramus as Rainbow
- Linda Redfearn as Toma
- Frank Salsedo as White Bird
- Vince St. Cyr as Chief Looking Glass
- Delroy White as Colonel Gibbon
- Lance Hool as Sergeant Giles
- Charles Ynfante as Yellow Wolf

== Awards and nominations ==
Jeb Rosebrook and Theodore Strauss were nominated for the Primetime Emmy Award for Outstanding Writing in a Special Program - Drama or Comedy - Original Teleplay. Robert K. Lambert received a nomination for the Primetime Emmy for Outstanding Achievement in Film Editing for Entertainment Programming for a Special.

== See also ==
- List of American films of 1975
