= Ned Romero =

American actor and opera singer

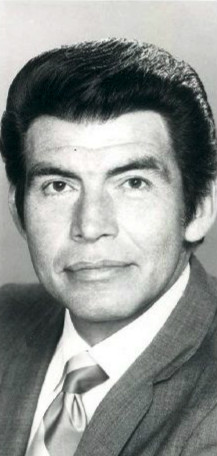
- Romero in 1970.
- Born: December 4, 1926; Franklin, Louisiana, U.S.
- Died: November 4, 2017 (aged 90); Palm Desert, California, U.S.
- Occupation: Actor
- Years active: 1943–2006
- Spouse: Jolene Lontere

Ned Romero (December 4, 1926 – November 4, 2017) was an American actor and opera singer who appeared in television and film.

== Early childhood and education ==
Romero was born on December 4, 1926, in Franklin, Louisiana, the seat of St. Mary Parish in South Louisiana, the son of Anna and Sidney Romero. His ancestry was Chitimacha Native American, as well as Spanish and French. Romero was a graduate of Louisiana State University, where he earned a master's degree in music.

== Stage ==
Romero began his career in 1943 as an opera singer, appearing in productions with the San Francisco Opera and in Los Angeles. He also appeared in musicals, such as Kiss Me, Kate, Kismet and Oklahoma!. On Broadway, he appeared in 3 for Tonight (1954).

== Television ==
After twenty years on the stage, he moved into television and film. His first television appearance was an opera skit on CBS's The Many Loves of Dobie Gillis with Dwayne Hickman, in which he performed a medley of famous opera arias. His roles as a regular cast member on TV shows included portraying investigator Bob Ramirez on The D.A., Broken Foot on Born to the Wind and Sgt. John Rivera on Dan August.

He subsequently appeared in several films and television programs. His credits include appearances in The Munsters, Walker: Texas Ranger, Tarzan, The Virginian, Star Trek: The Original Series, Star Trek: The Next Generation, Star Trek: Voyager, Custer, Police Woman, Land of the Lost, Diff'rent Strokes, Kung Fu, The Six Million Dollar Man, Ironside, Death Valley Days, The Incredible Hulk, Adam-12, and Emergency!, and in an unaired episode of the short-lived series The New Land.

He also played the lead role in a 1975 television drama of the life of Chief Joseph entitled: I Will Fight No More Forever. In 2006, he appeared in the feature film Expiration Date.

== Personal life ==
Romero's second wife was singer and dancer Jolene Lontere.

== Filmography ==
=== Film ===
- The Talisman (1966) as the Indian
- Winchester 73 (1967, TV Movie) as Wild Bear
- The Violent Ones (1967) as Mendoza
- Hang 'Em High (1968) as Charlie Blackfoot, Cooper Hanging Party
- Mark of the Gun (1969)
- Big Daddy (1969)
- Tell Them Willie Boy Is Here (1969) as Tom
- Gentle Savage (1973) as Richard Allen
- I Will Fight No More Forever (1975, TV Movie) as Chief Joseph
- Bigfoot and Wildboy as Ranger Lucas (1977)
- The Last of the Mohicans (1977, TV Movie) as Chingachgook
- The Deerslayer (1978, TV Movie) as Chingachgook
- Sultan and the Rock Star (1980, TV Movie) as Big Joe Ironwood
- Gone to Texas (1986, TV Movie) as Chief John Jolley
- House IV (1992) as Ezra
- Children of the Corn II: The Final Sacrifice (1992) as Frank Redbear
- Fabulous Shiksa in Distress (2003) as Sam
- Expiration Date (2006) as old native man (final film role)

=== Television ===
- The Virginian – episode Siege as Angelo (1963)
- McHale's Navy – episode The Great Eclipse as the fierce native (1964)
- Get Smart – episode Survival of the Fattest as agent #2 (1965)
- Shane – 6 episodes as Chips (1966)
- The Munsters – episode 56 Heap Big Herman as Wonga (1966)
- Rango – episode Rango the Outlaw as Hocker (1967)
- Laredo – episode Enemies and Brothers as Captain Montoya (1967)
- The F.B.I. – episode The Extortionist as Esteban Rodriguez (1967)
- Bonanza – episode In Defense of Honor as White Wolf (1968)
- Star Trek – episode A Private Little War as Krell (1968)
- The High Chaparral – episode For What We Are About to Receive as Carlos Mendoza (1968)
- The Virginian – episode The Heritage as Tza'Wuda (1968)
- The F.B.I. – episode Southwind as Alarcon (1968)
- Lancer – episode Cut the Wolf Loose as Wichita Jim (1969)
- The F.B.I. – episode The Patriot as Jose Orledo (1969)
- Dan August – 26 episodes as Det. Joe Rivera (1970–1971)
- The D.A. – episode The People vs. Drake as D.A. Investigator Bob Ramirez (1971)
- Banacek – episode No Sign of the Cross as Chief Frank Mendoza (1972)
- Cannon – episode A Long Way Down as Ben (1972)
- Adam-12 – episode Airdrop as Sgt. Jesse Marco (1972)
- Cannon – episode Trial by Terror as Sgt. Taggart (1973)
- Kung Fu – episodes The Cenotaph: Parts 1 & 2 as Lame Dog (1974)
- Harry O – episode Forty Reasons to Kill: Parts 1 & 2 as Deputy Gutierrez (1974)
- Kung Fu – episode Flight to Orion as Indian Leader (1975)
- Police Woman – episode Incident Near a Black and White as Gates (1975)
- The Six Million Dollar Man – episode Divided Loyalty as Boris (1975)
- Police Woman – episode Paradise Mall as Det. Ed (1975)
- Emergency! – episode 905-Wild as Officer Garcia (1975)
- Police Woman – episode Blast as Gomez (1975)
- The Blue Knight – episode A Slight Case of Murder (1976)
- Land of the Lost – episode Medicine Man as Lone Wolf (1976)
- The Six Million Dollar Man – episode The Thunderbird Connection as Akmed Khaduri (1976)
- Peter Lundy and the Medicine Hat Stallion as Red Cloud (1977)
- The Incredible Hulk – episode Rainbow's End as Thomas Logan (1978)
- Police Woman – episode A Shadow on the Sea as Delgado (1978)
- Galactica 1980 – episode Space Croppers as Hector Alonzo (1980)
- Lou Grant – episode Indians as Howard Sweetwater (1980)
- Dan August: Once Is Never Enough - TV Movie as Sergeant Joe Rivera (1980)
- Dan August: The Jealousy Factor – TV Movie as Sergeant Joe Rivera (1980)
- Dan August: Murder, My Friend - TV Movie as Joe Rivera (1980)
- Disney's Wonderful World – episode Sultan and the Rock Star as Big Joe Ironwood (1980)
- Quincy, M.E. – episode Vigil of Fear as Ramon (1981)
- Diff'rent Strokes – episode Burial Ground as John Longwalker (1982)
- Simon & Simon – episode The Cop Who Came to Dinner as Clerk (1986)
- Santa Barbara – episode Episode #1.1455. #1.1458, and #1.1459 as Shaman (1990)
- MacGyver – episode "The Mountain of Youth" as Baba (1992)
- Northern Exposure "Sleeping With The Enemy" as Leston (1993)
- Murder, She Wrote – episode "Northern Explosion" as Joe Quill (1994)
- Star Trek: The Next Generation – episode Journey's End as Anthwara (1994)
- Diagnosis: Murder – episode The Restless Remains as Mr. Clarke (1994)
- The Magnificent Seven – episode Ghosts of the Confederacy as Seminole Chief (1998)
- Walker, Texas Ranger – episodes Tribe, and War Cry as Judge Henry Fivekills (1998)
- Walker, Texas Ranger – episode Way of the Warrior as Shaman (1999)
- Star Trek: Voyager – episode The Fight as Chakotay's Great-Grandfather (1999)
- Roswell – episodes River Dog (season 1 episode 7, 1999), The Balance (season 1 episode 10), and Into the Woods (season 1 episode 12)
- Walker, Texas Ranger – episode White Buffalo as Ned Grey Fox (2000)
