= Sultan and the Rock Star =

- Genre: Adventure; Drama
- Based on: Sandy and the Rock Star by Walt Morey
- Written by: Steve Hayes
- Directed by: Ed Abroms
- Starring: Timothy Hutton; Ken Swofford; Bruce Glover; Ned Romero; Richard Paul; Pat Delaney; Shug Fisher; Brendan Dillon; Elven Havard; Wayne Winton; John Lawrence
- Music by: Artie Butler
- Country of origin: United States
- Original language: English

Production
- Executive producer: Ron Miller
- Producer: Jerome Courtland
- Cinematography: Mike Swetten
- Editor: Dennis A. Orcutt
- Running time: 60 minutes
- Production company: Walt Disney Productions

Original release
- Network: NBC
- Release: April 20, 1980

Sultan and the Rock Star (also known as The Hunter and the Rock Star) is a 1980 American made-for-television adventure drama film starring Timothy Hutton and based on the novel Sandy and the Rock Star by Walt Morey, with the major difference being the titular cat is a mountain lion and not a tiger. It was originally broadcast on NBC as an episode of Disney's Wonderful World on April 20, 1980.

== Synopsis ==
Paul Winters (Timothy Hutton) is an overworked teenage rock star who escapes from his fans and obligations to hide out on "Sportsman's Island", where he befriends Sultan, a gentle 400-pound show biz Bengal tiger. When he discovers the friendly feline is scheduled to be hunted and killed by the island's cruel owner, George McKinzie, Paul scrambles to protect his newfound friend.

== Cast ==
- Timothy Hutton as Paul Winters
- Sultan as himself
- Ken Swofford as George McKinzie
- Bruce Glover as Alec Frost
- Ned Romero as Joe Ironwood
- Richard Paul as Al Matthews
- Pat Delaney as Mrs. Winters
- Shug Fisher as Motel Owner
- Brendan Dillon as Hicks
- Elven Havard as First Officer
- Wayne Winton as Jake
- John Lawrence as The Fisherman

== Song ==
- "Deeper in Love" George Thomas Charouhas and Steven B. Furman

== Filming ==
Sultan and the Rock Star was filmed on location in July 1979 at Morro Bay, San Luis Obispo County, California.

During pre-production, Timothy Hutton spent two weeks at Disney's Golden Oak Ranch in Canyon County, California learning how to act around Sultan; he admitted that he was scared out of his wits for the first few days of training because it wasn't easy to be natural, loose and funny while acting with a tiger.

== Home media ==
The film was released on DVD under the title The Hunter and the Rock Star exclusively through the Disney Movie Club and DisneyStore.com on May 1, 2012. On May 2, 2013, it was restored back to its original title and made available for rent or purchase via the "DisneyMoviesOnDemand" channel on YouTube.
