= Linda Redfearn =

American actress

Linda Moon Redfearn
- Born: December 2, 1939; Dallas, Texas, U.S.
- Died: November 23, 2014 (aged 74); Arkansas, U.S.
- Spouses: Ronnie George Redfearn; Emilio Delgado; Guy Reese (died 2010)

Linda Moon Redfearn (December 2, 1939 – November 23, 2014) was an American actress. She is best known for her appearance as Toma, the wife of Chief Joseph in the 1975 television film I Will Fight No More Forever.

== Early and personal life ==
Linda Moon was born in Dallas, Texas; her father was 3/4 Cherokee, and her English-Irish mother was descended from Carrie Nation. After graduating from high school, she modeled for Neiman Marcus for seven years and married Ronnie George Redfearn, with whom she had two sons. After that marriage ended, she moved to Los Angeles to work as the fashion coordinator at an I. Magnin store, and soon began acting full time.

== Career ==
Sophia Loren is Italian and looks it, but she doesn't go around dressed like an Italian peasant. Yet people expect me to wear a feather and go 'ugh' a lot.

— Linda Redfearn, from 1975 NEA article by Dick Kleiner

Redfearn's first prominent role was as the "resident Indian" on Rowan & Martin's Laugh-In starting in 1970. She also appeared in The Omega Man and Li'l Abner. Other guest roles include appearances in The Quest, Police Woman, The White Buffalo, and the 1977 miniseries How the West Was Won.

Redfearn also appeared as the wife of Painted Bear in a miniseries that was filmed in 1978 as a prelude for a planned series; the miniseries was shelved and not aired until 1982 as Born to the Wind.

== Filmography ==
Film
Year	Title	Role	Notes
1971	The Omega Man	Family Member	
1974	Larry		
1975	I Will Fight No More Forever	Toma	
1977	The White Buffalo	Black Shawl	
1982	Life of the Party: The Story of Beatrice	Jessie	

Television
Year	Title	Role	Notes
1970–71	Rowan & Martin's Laugh-In	(uncredited)	6 episodes
1975	The Quest	Motahevae	Episode: "The Buffalo Hunters"
1977	How the West Was Won	Little Tree	2 episodes
1977	Hawaii Five-O	Gloria	Episode: "The Ninth Step"
1977	Police Woman	Miriam	Episode: "Banker's Hours"
1978	Police Woman	Indian Woman	Episode: "Sons"
1978	Born to the Wind	Prairie Woman	miniseries (aired 1982)
