= Groove Squad =

2002 television film by Patrick A. Ventura

- Written by: Mitch Watson
- Directed by: Patrick A. Ventura
- Starring: Jennifer Love Hewitt; Kathleen Barr; Meghan Black; Tina Bush; Andrea Libman; Vanessa Morley; Cat Sides; Valerie Sing Turner; Andrew Francis
- Music by: Andrea Franklin
- Country of origin: United States
- Original language: English

Production
- Executive producers: Andy Heyward; Michael Maliani
- Producers: Olivier Callet; Emily Montaniel; Shannon Nettleton
- Editor: Marylin Graf
- Running time: 80 minutes
- Production companies: DIC Entertainment; One Explosion Studios

Original release
- Network: Nickelodeon
- Release: November 24, 2002

Groove Squad Cheerleaders is a 2002 animated television film produced by DIC Entertainment as part of the DIC Movie Toons series of films. It debuted on Nickelodeon on November 24, 2002 and was later released on VHS and DVD by MGM Home Entertainment, eventually airing internationally on Disney Channel and Toon Disney. The titular squad consists of three high school cheerleaders and best friends who gain superpowers after accidentally being zapped by a jolt of electricity from the mad scientist Dr. Nightingale. With help from their team mascot and their hairstylist, a former Mi6-agent, they must learn to use their newfound powers to defeat Dr. Nightingale while hiding their identities as superheroes and win the annual cheerleading competition. It was the only film of the DIC Movie Toons to be an original story, as the other films were either based on existing cartoons or adapted from classic literature.

== Plot ==
Chrissy, Ping, and Mackenzie are a trio of best friends who are students and cheerleaders at Bay City High School in Bay City. They are ordinary teenage girls, concerned with their looks, boys, and preparing for school dances and the upcoming cheerleading competition. While at a hair salon owned and operated by Chrissy's friend, Adrienne, they are zapped by a jolt of electricity that gives them superpowers, which are activated when they transform into superheroes by drinking a fruit smoothie: Chrissy gains superhuman strength, Ping gains flight, and Mackenzie gains X-ray vision. With help from Adrienne and Zeke, the team mascot for Bay City High School, they fight against Dr. Nightingale, who is the father of their fellow cheerleader Star, to thwart his plans for world domination.

While they are excited to become superheroes, they soon learn that being a superhero is not as easy as they thought, as they must learn how to use their powers and work as a team. Eventually, they defeat Dr. Nightingale and his minions, at least for the time being, and win the cheerleading competition.

== Characters ==
=== Main ===
- Chrissy (voiced by Jennifer Love Hewitt): The narrator of the story, she is the captain of Bay City High School's cheerleading team and the leader of the Groove Squad, and possesses the power of superhuman strength. She has a rivalry with Star Nightingale, who wants to replace her as the school's head cheerleader, and has a strong crush on foreign exchange student Fernando. Although she can be a diva at times, she is kind and a good leader.
- Ping (voiced by Valerie Sing Turner): One of Chrissy's two best friends, Ping is Asian-American and has the power of flight. Though she can be ditzy and melodramatic, she is kind and has moments of brilliance. She and Zeke have feelings for each other and are implied to have become a couple, as they attend the school dance together.
- Mackenzie (voiced by Bettina Bush): One of Chrissy's two best friends, who is nicknamed "Mac" and is the smartest and most mature of the group. She is African-American and possesses the power of X-ray vision. Unlike Chrissy and Ping, she does not have a crush or love interest until Adrienne sets her up with his friend Derek.
- Zeke (voiced by Andrew Francis): The closest male friend of the Groove Squad, who is the team mascot of Bay City High School. Despite lacking superpowers, he helps them by keeping their superhero identities a secret and assisting them on missions, with Adrienne upgrading his car. Though not an official cheerleader, he takes Star's place in a routine and helps them win the cheerleading championship. He and Ping have feelings for each other and eventually start dating.
- Adrienne (voiced by Blu Mankuma): A hairstylist from England who provides the Groove Squad with special containers that hold their fruit smoothies and allow them to transform into superheroes. He also helps them learn how to use their superpowers and thwart Dr. Nightingale's plans for world domination. Before becoming a hairstylist in Bay City, he worked as an Mi6 agent under the codename 0064.2 and fought against Dr. Nightingale, also working in the fashion industry. He has a pet dog named Napoleon and later sets up Mackenzie with his friend Derek.

=== Antagonists ===
- Dr. Nathaniel Nightingale (voiced by Mackenzie Gray): The main antagonist, he is a mad scientist with plans for world domination and an old enemy of Adrienne's from his days as an MI6 agent in England. He first meets Chrissy, Ping and Mackenzie when they save him and Larry the Cyborg after his Brain Buster-laser malfunctions. He is Star's father, and, despite being a supervillain, they care for each other.
- Star Nightingale (voiced by Meghan Black): One of Chrissy, Ping and Mackenzie's fellow cheerleaders at Bay City High School, she is a rival to Chrissy and wants to take her place as their school's head cheerleader. Like her, she has a crush on Fernando and wants to win his attention and love. She is later revealed to be Dr. Nightingale's daughter, being as evil as him. After she injures her ankle and is unable to perform at the cheerleading competition, Zeke takes her place.
- Larry (voiced by Alec Willows): Dr. Nightingale's cyborg sidekick, who has known him for at least fifteen years and is loyal to him, but is cowardly and unintelligent.
- Flower Power: A trio of superpowered hippies who Dr. Nightingale hires to distract the Groove Squad and prevent them from interfering in his plans and to help Star become head cheerleader at Bay City High School. The group consists of two men, one with red hair and one with blonde hair and a beard, and an African-American woman. They were zapped by the same jolt of electricity that gave the Groove Squad their superpowers, and their powers allow them to use their hair as extra limbs.

=== Other ===
- Stacy and Roxanne (voiced by Vanessa Morley and Kathleen Barr, respectively): Identical twin sisters who are Star's best friends and Chrissy, Ping and Mackenzie's fellow cheerleaders. They are eager to please Star and are usually in on her plans to take Chrissy's place as head cheerleader, but ultimately ditch her to perform with the Groove Squad after she injures her ankle and is unable to perform at the cheerleading competition. Before the Groove Squad manages to return in time for the competition and Star declares herself head cheerleader, they are unsure about having her as their new team captain, but eventually accept her.
- Fernando (voiced by Santo Lombardo): A Spanish-speaking exchange student and player on the Bay City High School football team. Both Chrissy and Star have a crush on him, and the rest of the cheerleaders seem to find him attractive as well, but Fernando only seems to have feelings for Chrissy and often tries to ask her out. He and Chrissy become a couple after he asks Chrissy to be his date to the school dance.

== Release ==
Groove Squad first aired in the United States on Nickelodeon and was broadcast internationally on Disney Channel, Toon Disney, and Super RTL. It was released on DVD by MGM Home Entertainment on June 3, 2003, and re-released by GT Media on February 12, 2008.
