= Gabriel Damon =

American actor

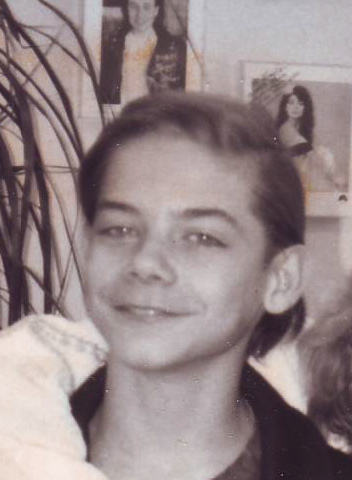
- Gabriel Damon at Premiere Radio Networks in 1987
- Born: Gabriel Damon Lavezzi; April 23, 1976 (age 50); Reno, Nevada, U.S.
- Occupations: Voice actor; actor
- Years active: 1984–2006
- Spouse: Angela Almanza (m. 2007; div. 2016)

Gabriel Damon Lavezzi (born April 23, 1976) is an American former child actor. His acting career involved providing the voices of Littlefoot in the 1988 film The Land Before Time and Little Nemo in the 1989 film Little Nemo: Adventures in Slumberland. He also played Hob in RoboCop 2 and a variety of live-action guest roles on television.

== Biography ==
Damon in 2026

Damon's career began with appearances in numerous commercials, with his first role in the 1984 TV series Call to Glory. He voiced Littlefoot the Apatosaurus in the first The Land Before Time, and Little Nemo in Little Nemo: Adventures in Slumberland. In 1990 he appeared as the juvenile criminal Hob in RoboCop 2 and in 1992 as Spot Conlon in Newsies. Damon has also made guest appearances in several television series, such as ER, Call to Glory, Star Trek: The Next Generation and Baywatch.

Damon retired from the entertainment industry in 2006.

== Filmography ==
- 1984 Call to Glory as R.H. Sarnac
- 1984 Shattered Vows as Daryl
- 1985 Amazing Stories as Bobby Mynes
- 1985 Punky Brewster as Lyle
- 1985 Diff'rent Strokes as Timmy Frankel
- 1985 Riptide as Simon Flynn
- 1986 Stranger in My Bed as Stuart Slater
- 1986-1987 One Big Family as Roger Hatton
- 1986 Webster as Mark
- 1986 Convicted as Joel Forbes
- 1986 Our House as Tommy
- 1987 Terminus as Mati
- 1987 Good Morning, Miss Bliss as Bradley
- 1987 Highway to Heaven as Bobby Martin
- 1987 Pound Puppies as Additional voices
- 1987 Who's the Boss? as Little Cornelius
- 1988 Journey to Spirit Island as Willie
- 1988 Tequila Sunrise as Cody McKussic
- 1988 Ohara as Unknown
- 1988 The Land Before Time as Littlefoot (voice)
- 1988 Superman as Additional voices
- 1989 Little Nemo: Adventures in Slumberland as Nemo (1992 voice over)
- 1989-1997 Baywatch as Todd
- 1989 Just Like Family as Coop
- 1989 Growing Pains as Kenny
- 1989 Mr. Belvedere as Billy Podell
- 1989 Just the Ten of Us as Alex Cutler
- 1989 Star Trek: The Next Generation: "The Bonding" as Jeremy Aster
- 1989-1990 The New Lassie as Wayne
- 1990 RoboCop 2 as Hob
- 1990 TaleSpin as Additional voices
- 1990 W.I.O.U. as Drew
- 1990 The Rock as Mario Dipucci
- 1991 Iron Maze as Mikey
- 1991 Eerie, Indiana as Nicholas
- 1992 Newsies as 'Spot' Conlon
- 1992 The Commish as Brad Harris
- 1993-1994 The Little Mermaid as Additional voices
- 1993 Sirens as Nicholas 'Beetle' Marque
- 1997 ER as Tommy
- 1997 Bayou Ghost as Peter
- 2001 Social Misfits as Jason
- 2005 Planet Ibsen (also co-producer) as Young Strindberg
- 2006 Danny Boy as Danny (final role)
