= Donavan Freberg =

American actor (born 1971)

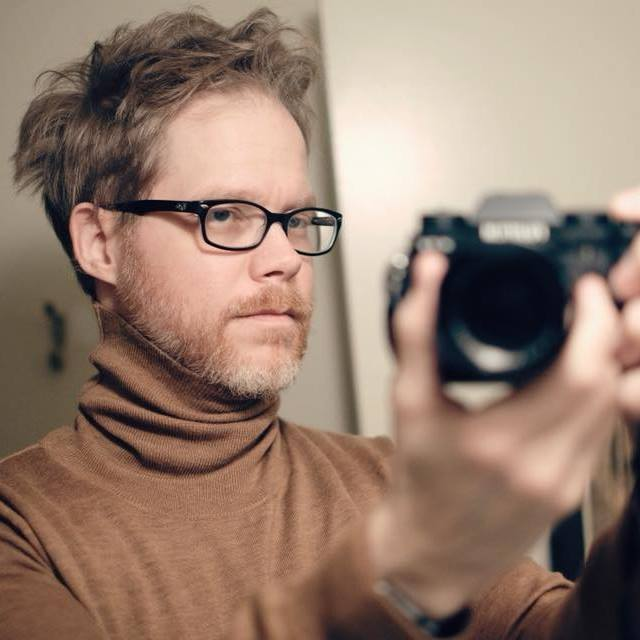
- Freberg in 2018
- Born: April 6, 1971 (age 55); Los Angeles, California, U.S.
- Occupations: Photographer, voice actor, writer
- Father: Stan Freberg
- Website: www.donavanfreberg.com

Donavan Freberg (born April 6, 1971) is an American photographer, advertising creative, voice actor, and writer.

Freberg is notable for appearing in a series of commercials for Encyclopædia Britannica produced by his father, satirist and advertising creative Stan Freberg. The 1988–1993 advertising campaign was the most successful in the company's 200-year history and Donavan was elevated to cult status. He was parodied on Saturday Night Live and dubbed a "Pop Intellectual" by GQ magazine. He was spoofed in a 2003 feature in The Onion, and in 2006 was chosen for VH1's "100 Greatest Teen Stars," ranking number 83.

Freberg's voice-acting credits include Peanuts' Linus (1977–1978) and Charlie Brown (1978–1980) in commercials and public service announcements, Tom Little on The Littles (1983–1985), Montgomery Moose on The Get Along Gang, the video game Zork: Grand Inquisitor, and voiceovers for hundreds of radio and television commercials. He also performed the puppet character Baby Boolie on The Weird Al Show.

Freberg currently works as a portrait photographer in Los Angeles. His work has been featured in Los Angeles magazine, and the Instagram book This Is Happening. Freberg's headshot clientele include the CEO of Snapchat, Evan Spiegel.
