= John Peterson (author) =

American writer (1924–2002)

- Born: February 10, 1924; Bradford, Pennsylvania, US
- Died: November 30, 2002 (aged 78)
- Education: Pratt Institute
- Occupation: author of children's books
- Known for: The Littles, The Secret-Hide Out
- Spouse: Holly (Simmonds)
- Children: 4

John Lawrence Peterson (February 10, 1924 – November 30, 2002) was an American author of children's books. He is best known as the creator of The Littles, which began as a series of books in 1967, later adapted into an animated cartoon series by DiC Entertainment. Peterson was also the author of The Secret Hide-Out, a popular Scholastic Books title in the 1960s and 1970s.

== Biography ==
Peterson was born in Bradford, Pennsylvania on February 10, 1924, and attended Pratt Institute before volunteering and serving as a paratrooper of the 11th Airborne Division in World War II. After the war, he returned to Pratt Institute and graduated in 1948. He lived in the Clinton Hill district of Brooklyn, New York with his wife Holly (Simmonds), also a Pratt graduate, where he had sons Chris (John Christopher), Matthew James, and Joel David Barnes, and a daughter Elizabeth Holly. Peterson later moved to Hankins, New York. Peterson died on November 30, 2002 at the age of seventy-eight. He had ten grandchildren, nine of whom were his son John Christopher's with his wife Susan Ferwerda (married 1973); William Lawrence (b. 1974), Joan Winifred, Carl Henry, Emily Susan (b.1978), Lars Andrew (b. 1980) Margaret Bromilow (b.1982), John Matthew (b.1983), Mark Ole (b.1985), and Kristin Lily (b.1989). His daughter Elizabeth Holly adopted a son, Samuel with her partner Jean.

John Peterson was an illustrator for advertising and magazines for two decades before writing his first book, Tony's Treasure Hunt, later renamed Terry's Treasure Hunt. Another Peterson title is How to Write Codes and Send Secret Messages featuring such tricks as mirror writing, the reverse mirror code, and the use of invisible ink.

During his lifetime, he spoke at US elementary schools, volunteered for the Boy Scouts and directed a Sunday school class with his wife Holly at an Episcopal church.
