= The Littles =

Children's book series by John Peterson

- Cover of The Terrible Tiny Kid
- Author: John Peterson
- Language: English
- Genre: Fantasy
- Publisher: Scholastic Publishing
- Publication date: 4/1/1967
- Media type: Paperback

The Littles is a series of children's novels by American author John Peterson, the first of which was published in 1967. Sixteen years later, Peterson's books were adapted into The Littles, an animated series by DIC Entertainment. The television show formerly ran on ABC Saturday mornings from September 10, 1983 to November 2, 1985 for three seasons and 29 episodes. In 1985, DiC released an animated feature film spun off the series titled Here Come the Littles.

Similar to Mary Norton's earlier novel The Borrowers, The Littles features the Littles, a family of tiny, intelligent humanoid creatures with long furry tails who live in a house owned by the Bigg family. Their height is 4–6 inches (10–15 cm).

== Characters ==
=== The Little Family ===
The Littles are a family of tiny people living in the walls of human houses. The Little family consists of William T. Little and Wilma Little (Frank and Helen in the TV series), their children Tom and Lucy, and Uncle Pete (Grandpa Little in the TV series). In the books, Uncle Nick, Uncle Pete, Granny and Grandpa (Amos), and Baby Betsy live with the family. Relatives who do not live with them include Cousin Dinky, his wife Della, his mother Lily the nurse, Granny's sister Littlebit, and her cousins Tracy and Gracie.

==== Tom and Lucy Little ====
Tom and Lucy Little both insist on doing good deeds for big people, including a blind woman. One time they tried to find a Grandma Little for Grandpa. They can make mischief around the place.

==== Dinky ====
An older cousin of the other Littles, he is a pilot and serves as the mail service and occasional transport for all tiny people in the area. In the books he flies a glider (competently) and is responsible and adventurous; in the TV series he flies a propeller plane (poorly) and he is clumsy and frequently gets into trouble. Usually these troubles remit directly into Grandpa Little, who loses his temper and charges into "disciplining" the unfortunate Dinky. In the books he marries Della, who learns to fly. While he lives with his mother Lilly the nurse in the books, in the TV series he lives with the family.

==== Ashley ====
A younger cousin of Tom and Lucy, and portrayed as a tantrum-prone and rebellious spoiled brat, he often sabotages whatever his older cousins accomplish, only to feel bad about it when Tom and Lucy are put in danger as a result. He appears only in the TV series during seasons two and three.

=== Henry Bigg ===
Henry Bigg is the boy who lives in a house with The Littles. He never discovers the Littles in the book series, but in the cartoon he is one of the few people who knows of the Littles' existence.

The first season of the TV series never revealed how Henry learned about the Littles, as it opened with Henry telling the audience that he has "a very special secret" and is the only one who knows about the Littles. During the second season, the opening says that Tom and Lucy fell inside Henry's suitcase when he moved; he discovered them when he opened his suitcase afterward. In the final season, Henry traveled to other parts of the world with his parents, using a specially designed carrier (a hollowed-out camera case) to take the Littles with him.

The film Here Come the Littles follows the second season opening in that Tom and Lucy get trapped in Henry's suitcase, but Henry does not discover them until much later, first seeing Grandpa and Dinky while mowing his Uncle Augustus' yard. Augustus takes them away from Henry, believing them to be toys. To rescue Grandpa and Dinky, Tom and Lucy decide to reveal themselves to Henry, befriending him and asking him for help.

Henry takes great care to keep other people, including his own parents, from learning about the Littles. In one episode, however ("Dinky's Doomsday Pizzas"), Henry betrayed the Littles when he learned that, if he did, he would be on television. The incident, and its resulting fallout, turned out to be only a dream, specifically Dinky's dream.

=== Slick ===
Slick is Henry's pet turtle who is usually seen hanging with The Littles. In emergencies when Tom and Lucy must contact Henry, they tie messages on Slick's back and send them to him. Slick wears roller skates to move more quickly but often comically slips and slides around.

=== Glory ===
Glory becomes Tom's friend in "The Littles and their Amazing new Friend" after she saves Tom and Uncle nick from a haystack fire.

== Bibliography ==
=== The Littles series ===
- The Littles, Roberta Carter Clark, illustrator, 1967
- The Littles Take a Trip, 1968
- The Littles To the Rescue, Roberta Carter Clark, illustrator, 1968
- The Littles Have a Wedding, Roberta Carter Clark, illustrator, 1971
- The Littles Give a Party, Roberta Carter Clark, illustrator, 1972 (originally issued as The Littles Surprise Party)
- The Littles and the Great Halloween Scare, Roberta Carter Clark, illustrator, 1975 (originally issued as Tom Little's Great Halloween Scare)
- The Littles and the Trash Tinies, 1977
- The Littles Go Exploring, Roberta Carter Clark, illustrator, 1978
- The Littles and the Big Storm, Roberta Carter Clark, illustrator, 1979
- The Littles Go to School, 1983
- The Littles Treasury: Exciting Adventures With a Family of Tiny People, 1983 (a compendium of the first four Littles books)
- The Littles and the Lost Children, 1991
- The Littles and the Terrible Tiny Kid, Roberta Carter Clark and Jacqueline Rogers, illustrators, 1993
- The Littles and Their Amazing New Friend, 1999
- The Littles and the Scary Halloween, Jacqui Rogers, illustrator, 2002
- The Littles Have a Happy Valentine's Day, Jacquelin Rogers, illustrator, 2003 (adapted from The Littles Have a Wedding)

=== Not by John Peterson ===
- The Littles and the Surprise Thanksgiving Guests by Joel Peterson, Roberta Carter Clark, illustrator, 2004
- The Littles and the Perfect Christmas by Joel Peterson, illustrated by Jacqueline Rogers, 2004
- The Littles and the Missing Cat by Cheryl Mead
- The Littles Move In by Bob Clarke
- The Littles Riddles by Bob Clarke
- The Littles Help Out by Bob Clarke
- The Little Scouts by Dina Anastasio
- The Little Winner by Grace MacCarone and Suzanne Weyn
- The Littles Visit the Statue of Liberty by Lorentz Carlson
- The Littles Sticker Book by Suzanne Weyn
- The Littles Punch-Out Toy Book by James Razzi

=== Littles First Readers series ===
- Littles First Readers: The Littles and the Big Blizzard, Jacqui Rogers, illustrator
- Littles First Readers: The Littles and the Secret Letter, Jaqueline Rogers, illustrator
- Littles First Readers: The Littles and the Summer Storm, with Teddy Slater, Jacqueline Rogers, illustrator
- Littles First Readers: The Littles Get Lost
- Littles First Readers: The Littles Get Trapped!, Jacqui Rogers, illustrator
- Littles First Readers: The Littles Go Around the World, with Teddy Slater, Jacqueline Rogers, illustrator
- Littles First Readers: The Littles Go On A Hike, Jaqueline Rogers, illustrator
- Littles First Readers: The Littles Have a Merry Christmas, Jacquelin Rogers, illustrator
- Littles First Readers: The Littles Make A Friend, Jacqui Rogers, illustrator
- Littles First Readers: The Littles and the Scary Halloween, Jaqueline Rogers, illustrator
- Littles First Readers: The Littles Do Their Homework, Jacqueline Rogers, illustrator

=== Littles sets ===
- The Littles Set #1: The Littles; The Littles to the Rescue; The Littles and the Lost Children; and The Littles Have a Wedding
- The Littles Set #2: Littles and the Big Storm; Littles and the Trash Tinies; Littles and the Terrible Tiny Kid; and The Littles Go To School
- The Littles Set #3: Littles and the Great Halloween Scare; Littles Take a Trip; Littles Go Exploring; and The Littles and Their Amazing New Friend

=== Other Littles books ===
- The Littles Reproducible Activities
- The Littles and Their Friends; William T. Little, John Peterson; Scholastic, 1981
- The Littles' Scrapbook: A Facsimile Reproduction of Pages from a Tiny Person's Book, Enlarged Six Times; William T. Little, John Peterson; Scholastic, 1987
