= 1988–89 United States network television schedule (daytime) =

The following is the 1988–89 daytime network television schedule for the three major English-language commercial broadcast networks in the United States. It covers the weekday and weekend daytime hours from September 1988 to August 1989.

== Legend ==
- Light yellow indicates talk shows.
- Green indicates soap operas.
- Pink indicates game shows.
- Gold indicates news and public affairs programming.
- Light teal indicates sporting events.
- White indicates local programming.
- Light purple indicates children's programming.
- Gray indicates encore programming (e.g., reruns of prime-time programming).
- New series are highlighted in **bold**.

== Schedule ==
- All times correspond to U.S. Eastern and Pacific Time scheduling (except for some live sports or events). Except where affiliates slot certain programs outside their network-dictated timeslots, subtract one hour for Central, Mountain, Alaska, and Hawaii-Aleutian times.
- Local schedules may differ, as affiliates have the option to pre-empt or delay network programs. Such scheduling may be limited to preemptions caused by local or national breaking news or weather coverage (which may force stations to tape delay certain programs to later timeslots) and any major sports events scheduled to air in a weekday timeslot (mainly during major holidays). Stations may air shows at other times at their preference.

=== Monday–Friday ===
Network		6:00 am	6:30 am	7:00 am	7:30 am	8:00 am	8:30 am	9:00 am	9:30 am	10:00 am	10:30 am	11:00 am	11:30 am	noon	12:30 pm	1:00 pm	1:30 pm	2:00 pm	2:30 pm	3:00 pm	3:30 pm	4:00 pm	4:30 pm	5:00 pm	5:30 pm	6:00 pm	6:30 pm
ABC	Fall	ABC World News This Morning		Good Morning America				Local/syndicated programming				The Home Show		Ryan's Hope	Loving	All My Children		One Life to Live		General Hospital		Local/syndicated programming					ABC World News Tonight with Peter Jennings
ABC	October	ABC World News This Morning		Good Morning America				Local/syndicated programming				Growing Pains	The Home Show	Ryan's Hope	Loving	All My Children		One Life to Live		General Hospital		Local/syndicated programming					ABC World News Tonight with Peter Jennings
ABC	January	ABC World News This Morning		Good Morning America				Local/syndicated programming				The Home Show		Growing Pains	Loving	All My Children		One Life to Live		General Hospital		Local/syndicated programming					ABC World News Tonight with Peter Jennings
CBS	Fall	CBS Morning News		CBS This Morning				Local/syndicated programming		Family Feud	Card Sharks	The Price Is Right		Local/syndicated programming	The Young and the Restless		The Bold and the Beautiful	As the World Turns		Guiding Light		Local/syndicated programming					CBS Evening News with Dan Rather
CBS	Spring	CBS Morning News		CBS This Morning				Local/syndicated programming		Family Feud	**Now You See It**	The Price Is Right		Local/syndicated programming	The Young and the Restless		The Bold and the Beautiful	As the World Turns		Guiding Light		Local/syndicated programming					CBS Evening News with Dan Rather
CBS	Summer	CBS Morning News		CBS This Morning				Local/syndicated programming		Family Feud	**Wheel of Fortune**	The Price Is Right		Local/syndicated programming	The Young and the Restless		The Bold and the Beautiful	As the World Turns		Guiding Light		Local/syndicated programming					CBS Evening News with Dan Rather
NBC	Fall	NBC News at Sunrise		Today				Local/syndicated programming		Sale of the Century	Classic Concentration	Wheel of Fortune	Win, Lose or Draw	Super Password	Scrabble	Days of Our Lives		Another World		Santa Barbara		Local/syndicated programming					NBC Nightly News with Tom Brokaw
NBC	Spring	NBC News at Sunrise		Today				Local/syndicated programming		Scrabble	Classic Concentration	Wheel of Fortune	Win, Lose or Draw	Local/syndicated programming	**Generations**	Days of Our Lives		Another World		Santa Barbara		Local/syndicated programming					NBC Nightly News with Tom Brokaw
NBC	Summer	NBC News at Sunrise		Today				Local/syndicated programming		Scrabble	Classic Concentration	**The Golden Girls**	Win, Lose or Draw	Local/syndicated programming	**Generations**	Days of Our Lives		Another World		Santa Barbara		Local/syndicated programming					NBC Nightly News with Tom Brokaw

ABC note: From September 19–30, 1988, Home aired for one hour, commandeering reruns of Growing Pains.

NBC note: NBC returned the 12:00 noon time slot to its affiliates beginning March 27, 1989, after Super Password finished its run three days earlier. Many NBC affiliates did not air the show in this timeslot, instead opting to air local news. The new soap Generations was available to affiliates at noon/11:00 CT or 12:30/11:30 CT.

=== Saturday ===
Network		7:00 am	7:30 am	8:00 am	8:30 am	9:00 am	9:30 am	10:00 am	10:30 am	11:00 am	11:30 am	noon	12:30 pm	1:00 pm	1:30 pm	2:00 pm	2:30 pm	3:00 pm	3:30 pm	4:00 pm	4:30 pm	5:00 pm	5:30 pm	6:00 pm	6:30 pm
ABC	Fall	Local and/or syndicated programming		**The New Adventures of Beany and Cecil**	**The New Adventures of Winnie the Pooh**		Slimer! and the Real Ghostbusters		**A Pup Named Scooby-Doo**	The Bugs Bunny and Tweety Show		Animal Crack-Ups	ABC Weekend Special	ABC Sports / College Football on ABC											
ABC	October	Local and/or syndicated programming		The Flintstone Kids (R)	**The New Adventures of Winnie the Pooh**		Slimer! and the Real Ghostbusters		**A Pup Named Scooby-Doo**	The Bugs Bunny and Tweety Show		Animal Crack-Ups	ABC Weekend Special	ABC Sports / College Football on ABC											
ABC	Winter	Local and/or syndicated programming		The Flintstone Kids (R)	**The New Adventures of Winnie the Pooh**		Slimer! and the Real Ghostbusters		**A Pup Named Scooby-Doo**	The Bugs Bunny and Tweety Show		Animal Crack-Ups	ABC Weekend Special	ABC Sports and/or local programming										Local news	ABC World News Saturday
CBS	Fall	Local and/or syndicated programming		**The Adventures of Raggedy Ann and Andy**	**Superman**	Jim Henson's Muppet Babies		Pee-wee's Playhouse	**Garfield and Friends**	**Hey Vern, It's Ernest!**	**Flip!**	Mighty Mouse: The New Adventures	CBS Storybreak	CBS Sports and/or local programming										Local news	CBS Evening News
CBS	November	Local and/or syndicated programming		**The Adventures of Raggedy Ann and Andy**	**Superman**	Jim Henson's Muppet Babies		Pee-wee's Playhouse	**Garfield and Friends**	Mighty Mouse: The New Adventures	Teen Wolf (R)	Hey Vern, It's Ernest!	CBS Storybreak	CBS Sports and/or local programming										Local news	CBS Evening News
CBS	December	Local and/or syndicated programming		**The Adventures of Raggedy Ann and Andy**	**Superman**	Jim Henson's Muppet Babies		Pee-wee's Playhouse	**Garfield and Friends**	Hey Vern, It's Ernest!	Teen Wolf (R)	Mighty Mouse: The New Adventures	CBS Storybreak	CBS Sports and/or local programming										Local news	CBS Evening News
NBC	Fall	Local and/or syndicated programming		Kissyfur	Adventures of the Gummi Bears	The Smurfs		The ALF / **ALF Tales** Hour		The Chipmunks	**The Completely Mental Misadventures of Ed Grimley**	**2 Hip 4 TV**		NBC Sports and/or local programming										Local news	NBC Nightly News
NBC	October	Local and/or syndicated programming		Kissyfur	Adventures of the Gummi Bears	The Smurfs		The Chipmunks	The ALF / ALF Tales Hour		**The Completely Mental Misadventures of Ed Grimley**	Punky Brewster (R)	The New Archies (R)	NBC Sports and/or local programming										Local news	NBC Nightly News
NBC	January	Local and/or syndicated programming		Kissyfur	Adventures of the Gummi Bears	The Smurfs		The Chipmunks	The ALF / ALF Tales Hour		**The Completely Mental Misadventures of Ed Grimley**	Punky Brewster (R)	Fat Albert and the Cosby Kids (R)	NBC Sports and/or local programming										Local news	NBC Nightly News
NBC	February	Local and/or syndicated programming		Kissyfur	Adventures of the Gummi Bears	The Smurfs		The Chipmunks	The ALF / ALF Tales Hour		Fat Albert and the Cosby Kids (R)	Punky Brewster (R)	The Completely Mental Misadventures of Ed Grimley	NBC Sports and/or local programming										Local news	NBC Nightly News

=== Sunday ===
Network		7:00 am	7:30 am	8:00 am	8:30 am	9:00 am	9:30 am	10:00 am	10:30 am	11:00 am	11:30 am	noon	12:30 pm	1:00 pm	1:30 pm	2:00 pm	2:30 pm	3:00 pm	3:30 pm	4:00 pm	4:30 pm	5:00 pm	5:30 pm	6:00 pm	6:30 pm
ABC		Local and/or syndicated programming							This Week with David Brinkley		ABC Sports and/or local programming													Local news	ABC World News Sunday
CBS	Fall	Local and/or syndicated programming				CBS News Sunday Morning			Face the Nation	Local and/or syndicated programming		The NFL Today	NFL on CBS and/or local programming												
CBS	Mid-winter	Local and/or syndicated programming				CBS News Sunday Morning			Face the Nation	Local and/or syndicated programming		CBS Sports and/or local programming												Local news	CBS Evening News
NBC	Fall	Local and/or syndicated programming		Sunday Today			Meet the Press	Local and/or syndicated programming				NFL Live!	NFL on NBC												
NBC	Mid-winter	Local and/or syndicated programming		Sunday Today			Meet the Press	Local and/or syndicated programming				NBC Sports and/or local programming												Local news	NBC Nightly News

== By network ==
=== ABC ===
**Returning series**

- ABC Weekend Special
- ABC World News This Morning
- ABC World News Tonight with Peter Jennings
- All My Children
- Animal Crack-Ups
- The Bugs Bunny and Tweety Show
- The Flintstone Kids (reruns)
- General Hospital
- Good Morning America
- Growing Pains (reruns)
- The Home Show
- Loving
- One Life to Live
- Ryan's Hope
- Slimer! and the Real Ghostbusters
- This Week with David Brinkley

**New series**

- **The New Adventures of Beany and Cecil**
- **The New Adventures of Winnie the Pooh**
- **A Pup Named Scooby-Doo**

**Not returning from 1987–88**

- The Care Bears Family (moved to syndication)
- Little Clowns of Happytown
- Little Wizards
- Mr. Belvedere (reruns)
- My Pet Monster
- Pound Puppies
- Who's the Boss? (reruns)

=== CBS ===
**Returning series**

- As the World Turns
- The Bold and the Beautiful
- Card Sharks
- CBS Evening News
- CBS Morning News
- CBS News Sunday Morning
- CBS Storybreak
- CBS This Morning
- Face the Nation
- Family Feud
- Guiding Light
- Jim Henson's Muppet Babies
- Mighty Mouse: The New Adventures
- Pee-wee's Playhouse
- The Price Is Right
- Teen Wolf (reruns)
- The Young and the Restless

**New series**

- **The Adventures of Raggedy Ann and Andy**
- **Flip!**
- **Garfield and Friends**
- **Hey Vern, It's Ernest!**
- **Now You See It!**
- **Superman**
- **Wheel of Fortune**

**Not returning from 1987–88**

- Blackout
- Dennis the Menace
- Galaxy High (reruns)
- Hello Kitty's Furry Tale Theater
- Kidd Video (reruns)
- Popeye and Son
- The $25,000 Pyramid

=== NBC ===
**Returning series**

- Adventures of the Gummi Bears
- ALF
- The Chipmunks
- Another World
- Classic Concentration
- Days of Our Lives
- Fat Albert and the Cosby Kids (reruns)
- Kissyfur
- Meet the Press
- NBC News at Sunrise
- NBC Nightly News
- The New Archies (reruns)
- Punky Brewster (reruns)
- Sale of the Century
- Santa Barbara
- Scrabble
- The Smurfs
- Sunday Today
- Super Password
- Today
- Wheel of Fortune
- Win, Lose or Draw

**New series**

- **2 Hip 4 TV**
- **ALF Tales**
- **The Completely Mental Misadventures of Ed Grimley**
- **Generations**
- **The Golden Girls** (reruns)

**Not returning from 1987–88**

- Foofur
- Jim Henson's Fraggle Rock
- I'm Telling!

== See also ==
- 1988-89 United States network television schedule (prime-time)
- 1988-89 United States network television schedule (late night)

== Sources ==
- https://web.archive.org/web/20071015122215/http://curtalliaume.com/abc_day.html
- https://web.archive.org/web/20071015122235/http://curtalliaume.com/cbs_day.html
- https://web.archive.org/web/20071012211242/http://curtalliaume.com/nbc_day.html
