= It's Punky Brewster =

American animated television series

- Genre: Animation; Family; Fantasy
- Based on: Punky Brewster, created by David W. Duclon
- Directed by: Rudy Larriva; John Kimball; Russell Mooney (season 1)
- Voices of: Casey Ellison; Ami Foster; Soleil Moon Frye; George Gaynes; Cherie Johnson; Frank Welker
- Theme music composer: Shuki Levy
- Opening theme: It's Punky Brewster
- Ending theme: It's Punky Brewster (instrumental)
- Composers: Shuki Levy; Haim Saban
- Country of origin: United States
- Original language: English
- No. of seasons: 2
- No. of episodes: 26

Production
- Executive producers: Joe Ruby; Ken Spears
- Producers: Larry Huber (season 1); Cliff Ruby (season 1); Elana Lesser (season 1); Cosmo Anzilotti (season 2)
- Running time: 30 minutes
- Production companies: Ruby-Spears Enterprises; NBC Studios

Original release
- Network: NBC
- Release: September 14, 1985 – December 6, 1986

It's Punky Brewster is a 1985–86 animated spin-off of the live-action television sitcom Punky Brewster. It was animated by Ruby-Spears Productions. The show uses the same premise and main cast as its parent series, but also includes a magical sprite named Glomer. 26 episodes were produced over two seasons.

== Synopsis ==
The series featured the voices of the original Punky Brewster cast as their respective characters. A new character, Glomer (voiced by Frank Welker), was added as the "leprechaun gopher". He came from Chaundoon, a city at the end of the rainbow and possesses all of magical powers. One such power was the ability to teleport Punky and her friends, Margaux, Cherie, and Allen, and at times her pet dog, Brandon, to any part of the Earth instantly. Some episodes included Glomer having to correct his own mistakes, as when he plays around with magic and transforms Henry into a statue of Julius Caesar.

== Title ==
It's Punky Brewster is the series' unofficial name (Punky when the show first premiered); on the title card and in TV listings, it is simply called Punky Brewster.

== Release ==
In season 2, shows up 4 through 13 had a first-run episode and a rerun from the first season. The show was canceled in September 1987, but reruns came back from October 1988 until September 1989 after NBC's live-action, preteen-aimed show 2 Hip 4 TV was cancelled. The show was syndicated as a revolving feature of Maxie's World during the 1989–90 season.

== Cast ==
- Soleil Moon Frye - Punky Brewster
- George Gaynes - Henry Warnimont
- Ami Foster - Margaux Kramer
- Cherie Johnson - Cherie Johnson
- Casey Ellison - Allen Anderson
- Frank Welker - Glomer, Brandon (barking; speaking voice in "Brandon the Dialogue Dog")

=== Additional voices ===
- René Auberjonois (Note: Season 1)
- Vince Edwards (Note: Season 2)
- Pat Fraley
- Alejandro Garay
- Linda Gary
- Patty Glick
- Renae Jacobs
- Christina Lange
- Katie Leigh
- Joycelyne Lew
- Tress MacNeille
- Mea Martineau
- Janet Mays
- David Mendenhall
- Scott Menville - Chucky
- Lilly Moon
- Pat Musick
- Denise Pickering
- Hal Rayle
- Josh Rodine
- Neil Ross
- Shavar Ross

Susie Garrett, who played Betty Johnson, and T. K. Carter, who played Mike, are the only regular cast members of the sitcom that did not appear in the cartoon.

== Episodes ==
=== Season 1 (1985) ===
No. overall	No. in season	Title	Written by	Original release date
1	1	"Punky to the Rescue / The Quartersize Quarterback"	Matt Uitz & Michael Chain Michael Chain	September 14, 1985
Punky to the Rescue: Punky persuades Henry into taking a photography job over a Florida swamp. She and the gang tag along (thanks to Glomer) and she thinks Henry may get caught by a swamp monster.; The Quartersize Quarterback: Glomer gives Allen the abilities of a professional football quarterback.
2	2	"The Gold Rush / Phar Out Pharaoh"	Sheryl Scarborough Cliff Roberts	September 21, 1985
The Gold Rush: Bad Barney was a leprechaun who was deported from Chaundoon for his evil ways and trapped inside a plate. He tricks Glomer into freeing him by lying he has the means to get Glomer home, and Punky must return him to his imprisonment.; Phar Out Pharaoh: Glomer takes the kids to ancient Egypt to return a necklace Margaux has. She is mistaken for an Egyptian princess.
3	3	"Pretty Ugly / Glomer's Story"	Kayte Kuch & Sheryl Scarborough Cliff Ruby & Elana Lesser	September 28, 1985
Pretty Ugly: Just before a fancy party at the Bigelow estate, Glomer turns Margaux's face into a glomley one.; Glomer's Story: Punky recalls the day she met Glomer.
4	4	"Brandon the Dialogue Dog / Winning Isn't Everything"	Cliff Roberts Sheryl Scarborough	October 5, 1985
Brandon the Dialogue Dog: Glomer gives Brandon the gift of gab. A magazine writer sees this and tries to get rich off him.; Winning Isn't Everything: Punky and her pals scheme to win a TV set at a department store contest.
5	5	"Punky Wise and Pound Foolish / Christmas in July"	Gene Ayres Dianne Dixon	October 12, 1985
Punky Wise and Pound Foolish: Punky buys a baseball glove with the money she was supposed to use for Brandon's license. He is locked in a pound and subsequently sold to a rodeo clown.; Christmas in July: It is summer, and Punky is eyeing a skateboard. She has Glomer take everyone to Santa's workshop, but she causes an accident which causes it to snow all over the world! Glomer must track down Santa, who is vacationing on a tropical island, and get him to set things right. Since his elves are also on vacation, Punky is conscripted to help him, and she learns how hard he works.
6	6	"Return to Chaundoon / A Small Mistake"	Cliff Roberts Dianne Dixon	October 19, 1985
Return to Chaundoon: The rainbow gateway to Chaundoon appears, and Glomer can finally go home. Glomer takes Punky with him only to find his parents, along with all the other residents of Chaundoon, asleep due to the town's clock being stolen.; A Small Mistake: Glomer's beverage makes the kids shrink.
7	7	"Halloween Howlers / The Perils of Punky"	Janis Diamond Gary Greenfield	October 26, 1985
Halloween Howlers: Glomer spends Halloween with Punky and the kids. He turns everyone who doesn't give him a treat into a jack-o-lantern.; The Perils of Punky: Glomer transports the kids into an adventure movie.
8	8	"Glomer Punks Out / Louvre Affair"	Ted Field Cliff Ruby & Elana Lesser	November 2, 1985
Glomer Punks Out: A sleazy record producer wants to sign up Glomer's musical act.; Louvre Affair: Glomer fools around and turns Henry into a statue of Julius Caesar, which is sent from Chicago to Paris. Problems worsen when the Louvre's curator declares him a forgery, and Punky must save Henry before he is smashed to pieces.
9	9	"Growing Pain / Double Your Punky"	Gary Greenfield Michael Chain	November 9, 1985
Growing Pain: Pepperoni pizza makes Glomer grow. Punky tries to find a way to reduce him before the National Guard is deployed to Chicago.; Double Your Punky: While Punky is at a school picnic, Glomer creates a clone of her from a photograph to keep him company at home. But it is obnoxious, and he accidentally zaps the real Punky back into the photo. When the two Punkys finally lock horns, it's Brandon who sniffs out the real one.
10	10	"Spellbound / The Shoe Must Go On"	Cliff Roberts	November 23, 1985
Spellbound: Punky is in Washington, DC for the National Spelling Bee, where Glomer zaps a bee with the ability to make people spell out words.; The Shoe Must Go On: Glomer makes Cherie a pair of shoes that help her to dance. School diva Leonora Crump wants them for herself.
11	11	"Switchin' Places / How the Midwest Was Won"	Gary Greenfield Jack Enyart	November 30, 1985
Switchin' Places: To impress a girl, Allen switches bodies with Glomer.; How the Midwest Was Won: Punky and Allen have been protesting urban sprawl, and wants to see a nicer time before urbanization, so Glomer takes them to Chicago of 1803. There a man named Pierre LePelt is campaigning to stop a much smaller Chicago from expanding, earning the kids' admiration. Little does Punky realize Pierre LePelt is actually a poacher whose campaign is actually to continue hunting furs and pelts of the dwindling animal population.
12	12	"Any Wish Way You Can / The Bermuda Tangle"	Kayte Kuch Jack Enyart	December 7, 1985
Any Wish Way You Can: The wish spell Glomer intended for Punky hits Margaux instead. She wishes to be Queen with the others being her servants.; The Bermuda Tangle: In the dead of winter, Glomer takes the kids to a tropical island then loses his powers after getting hit in the head with a coconut.
13	13	"Unidentified Flying Glomer / Fish Story"	Sheryl Scarborough Dianne Dixon	December 14, 1985
Unidentified Flying Glomer: A pet groomer pursues Glomer after seeing him chasing a bird.; Fish Story: To help Punky win the role of a mermaid in a school play, Glomer turns her into an actual one.

=== Season 2 (1986) ===
Nº	Ep	Title	Written by	Original air date
14	1	"Little Orphan Punky / Punky's Millions"	Kayte Kuch & Sheryl Scarborough Gary Greenfield	September 13, 1986
Little Orphan Punky: Glomer fools around with his magic and makes animals run wild through Punky's home just as social services visits, causing Henry to be declared an unfit guardian. She gets placed into a new home run by an old lady named Mrs. Thrash who owns a candy factory, where she uses foster kids as slave labor in order to sell the candies and make money for her illegal business. One of Glomer's spells to free her backfires, resulting in her being stranded atop a TV tower during a lightning storm, causing this to be put on the news and a crowd to look in shock. The only one willing to scale the tower to rescue Punky is Henry.; Punky's Millions: Based on Brewster's Millions; Henry and Punky compete on a game show and are told they can win millions if they spend $1 million in a week. However, they can only spend so much on each expense, so they must get creative in different ways, such as Glomer making a racehorse lose and Punky finding different ways to help out an orphanage owned by a Catholic priest.
15	2	"Punky, Snow White and the Seven Dwarves / Punky the Heiress"	Janis Diamond Gary Greenfield	September 20, 1986
Punky, Snow White and the Seven Dwarves: Glomer brings the characters from the "Snow White" story out of the book.; Punky the Heiress: Punky's step-aunt and step-uncle use her to embezzle an heiress' fortune.
16	3	"Fair Feathered Friend / Be My Glomley"	Reed Robbins Cliff Roberts	September 27, 1986
Fair Feathered Friend: Glomer is jealous of a little bird Punky is nursing back to health.; Be My Glomley: A female glomley may be the key to Glomer's return to Chaundoon.
17	4	"All in Henry's Family"	Kayte Kuch & Sheryl Scarborough	October 4, 1986
Henry visits his eccentric sisters, bringing Punky and Cherie with him. This is the only segment in the series that Allen and Margaux do not appear.
18	5	"Call Me Ms."	Cliff Roberts	October 11, 1986
Henry is going out of town on a business trip and hires a nanny to housesit, annoying Punky who thinks she no longer needs supervision. She asks Glomer to turn her into a full-grown woman, only to find herself unrecognized by her friends and a fish out of the water in the adult workforce.
19	6	"Punky P.I."	Reed Robbins	October 18, 1986
Punky opens a detective agency at school.
20	7	"Mississippi Mud"	Barbara Chain	October 25, 1986
Glomer takes the kids to a turn-of-the-century riverboat in Mississippi.
21	8	"Punky's Half Acre"	Janis Diamond	November 1, 1986
Margaux makes a mess of things at Punky's pen pal's farm.
22	9	"Camp Confusion"	Gary Greenfield	November 8, 1986
It's Camp Tumbleweeds vs. Camp Towering Pines in athletic competition.
23	10	"Bright Eyes"	Kayte Kuch & Sheryl Scarborough	November 15, 1986
Cherie's deaf friend, Danny, wants to keep a lost puppy.
24	11	"Mother of the Year"	Herb Engelhardt	November 22, 1986
Tensions arise when Glomer creates a glomley-fueled mother for Punky.
25	12	"Allen Who?"	Kayte Kuch & Sheryl Scarborough	November 29, 1986
Glomer grants Allen's wish of never having been born.
26	13	"Caught in the Act"	Gary Greenfield	December 6, 1986
After Henry spots him in the kitchen, Glomer gives him amnesia just before an important photography assignment.

== Home media ==
The show was released on VHS in 1991, and several different tapes were made.

The series is available on DVD as part of the Punky Brewster DVD releases. Each season also contains a certain number of episodes from it as a bonus feature. Due to music rights issues, "The Shoe Must Go On" is the only episode not released on DVD in the season box sets released by Shout! Factory; a song featured in that episode was "Axel F" by Harold Faltermeyer, the theme to Beverly Hills Cop.

== Popular culture ==
The series was parodied in the Robot Chicken episode "But Not in That Way" (aired February 8, 2009) with Soleil Moon Frye reprising the title character's role, while Seth Green voiced Henry Warnimont and Tom Kane voiced Glomer.
