= Wrinkles (disambiguation) =

Wrinkles are folds, ridges, or creases in the skin or on fabric.

Wrinkle or Wrinkles may also refer to:

== Art and Entertainment ==
- Wrinkles (film), a 2011 Spanish animated film
- Wrinkles (radio series), a BBC radio comedy series
- "Wrinkles" (song), a 2002 song by Diamond Rio
- Wrinkles (toy), a line of plush toys

== People ==
- Margaret Wrinkle, American writer and documentary film maker
- Matthew Wrinkles (1960–2009), convicted multiple murderer
