= Children's and Family Emmy Award for Outstanding Younger Performer =

Award for young performer in a television series

Children's and Family Emmy Award for Outstanding Younger Performer in a Preschool, Children's or Young Teen Program
- Awarded for: Outstanding Younger Performer in a Preschool, Children's or Young Teen Program
- Country: United States
- Presented by: Academy of Television Arts & Sciences
- First award: 2022
- Currently held by: Christian Convery, Sweet Tooth (2025)
- Website: theemmys.tv/childrens/

The Children's and Family Emmy Award for Outstanding Younger Performer in a Preschool, Children's or Young Teen Program honors performances in both television series and made-for-television/streaming films and specials. The category was established at the 1st Children's and Family Emmy Awards in 2022, and is open to lead, supporting and guest performers of all genders who are under the age of 18. The category is a counterpart to the Lead and Supporting categories honoring performers in live action series, and is one of two awards specifically designed to award younger actors, alongside the Younger Voice Performer in an Animated or Preschool Animated Program category.

The first winner of the award was Quinn Copeland for her role as Izzy on the Peacock series Punky Brewster. The current holder of the award is Christian Convery, who won at the 4th Children's and Family Emmy Awards for his role as Gus in the Netflix special Sweet Tooth.

== Background ==
On November 17, 2021, the NATAS announced the creation of the Children's and Family Emmy Awards to recognize the best in children's and family television. The organization cited an "explosive growth in the quantity and quality of children’s and family programming" as justification for a dedicated ceremony. Many categories of the awards were previously presented at the Daytime Emmy Awards. From 1995 to 2021, voice performers were honored with the Daytime Emmy Award for Outstanding Performer in an Animated Program however, this category was discontinued following the announcement of the Children's and Family Emmys.

== Winners and nominations ==
=== 2020s ===
Year	Actor	Role	Program	Network	Refs
2022 (1st)
2022 (1st)	Quinn Copeland	Izzy	Punky Brewster	Peacock	
2022 (1st)	Malia Baker	Mary Anne Spier	The Baby-Sitters Club	Netflix	
2022 (1st)	Sammi Haney	Esperanza	Raising Dion	Netflix	
2022 (1st)	Momona Tamada	Claudia Kishi	The Baby-Sitters Club	Netflix	
2022 (1st)	Ja'Siah Young	Dion Warren	Raising Dion	Netflix	
2023 (2nd)
2023 (2nd)	Mykal-Michelle Harris	Alice Baxter	Raven's Home	Disney Channel	
2023 (2nd)	Marta Kessler	Constance Contraire	The Mysterious Benedict Society	Disney+	
2023 (2nd)	Matilda Lawler	Betty	The Santa Clauses	Disney+	
2023 (2nd)	Rupali Redd	Grace	The Santa Clauses	Disney+	
2024 (3rd)
2024 (3rd)	Phoenix Laroche	William	The Velveteen Rabbit	Apple TV+	
2024 (3rd)	Pyper Braun	Natasha Williams	Erin & Aaron	Nickelodeon	
2024 (3rd)	Noah Cottrell	Simon Grace	The Spiderwick Chronicles	The Roku Channel	
2024 (3rd)	Mykal-Michelle Harris	Alice Baxter	Raven's Home	Disney Channel	
2024 (3rd)	Alaya High	Lay Lay	That Girl Lay Lay	Nickelodeon	
2024 (3rd)	Leah Sava Jeffries	Annabeth Chase	Percy Jackson and the Olympians	Disney+	
2025 (4th)
2025 (4th)	Christian Convery	Gus	Sweet Tooth	Netflix	
2025 (4th)	Ravi Cabot-Conyers	Wim	Star Wars: Skeleton Crew	Disney+	
2025 (4th)	Lucian-River Chauhan	Ben	Me	Apple TV+	
2025 (4th)	Ava Joyce McCarthy	Phoebe Robinson	The Primrose Railway Children	BYUtv	
2025 (4th)	Naledi Murray	Wendy	Sweet Tooth	Netflix	
2025 (4th)	April V. Woods	Felicity Rivers	Malory Towers	BYUtv	

== Performers with multiple nominations ==
2 nominations

- Mykal-Michelle Harris

== Programs with multiple nominations ==
2 nominations

- Raising Dion
- Raven's Home
- Sweet Tooth
- The Baby-Sitters Club
- The Santa Clauses

== Networks with multiple nominations ==
7 nominations

- Disney+/Disney Channel

6 nominations

- Netflix

2 nominations

- BYUtv
- Nickelodeon
