= Ami Foster =

American actress (born 1975)

- Born: August 5, 1975 (age 51)
- Occupation: Actress/singer
- Years active: 1983–1995; 2021-present

Ami Foster (born August 5, 1975) is an American actress and singer. She is best known for her role as Margaux Kramer in the TV series Punky Brewster.

== Biography ==
Foster, a native of California, won the National Tap Dance Championship after which she was discovered on Star Search as a singer at age eight. In 1984, Foster landed her most notable role, in the NBC series Punky Brewster as Margaux Kramer, the spoiled upper class friend of the title character. During the run of Punky Brewster, Foster appeared on Circus of the Stars; she shared an act with actor-musician Corey Yothers, whose sister Tina (of Family Ties fame) was also featured that year in COTS.

Following the end of Punky Brewster in 1988, Foster appeared in various guest roles: on The Wonder Years, Quantum Leap, and Life Goes On. In 1986–87, she was the voice of Holly, the young owner of the Puppy Pound in the Pound Puppies television series. She also voiced Sally Brown in the 1988 animated Peanuts special Snoopy!!! The Musical and Lucy van Pelt in an episode of This Is America, Charlie Brown. In 1989, she had a role in the film Troop Beverly Hills. Foster's last role before taking an extended hiatus was in a 1995 episode of CBS Schoolbreak Special. In 2021, she returned to acting and reprised her role as Margaux Kramer in the Punky Brewster revival of the series in a guest appearance.

== Filmography ==
Film
Year	Film	Role	Notes
1986	Wrinkles: In Need of Cuddles	Amy Lenore Smith	Direct-to-video release
1987	When Mom and Dad Break Up	Singer/Child	Direct-to-video release
1989	Troop Beverly Hills	Claire Sprantz	
Television
Year	Title	Role	Notes
1983	Webster	Maxine	1 episode
1984	Fame	Tracy Donlon	1 episode
1984–1988	Punky Brewster	Margaux Kramer	58 episodes
1985	Wildside	Sissy Jonsen	1 episode
1985–1986	It's Punky Brewster	Margaux Kramer (Voice)	26 episodes
1986–1987	Pound Puppies	Holly (Voice)	26 episodes
1987	The Little Troll Prince	Kristi (Voice)	Television movie
1988	Snoopy!!! The Musical	Sally Brown (voice)	Television special
1988	CBS Summer Playhouse	Patty Palevski	1 episode
1988	Full House	Nina	1 episode
1988	This Is America, Charlie Brown	Lucy van Pelt (voice)	1 episode
1988	I'm Telling!	Herself	Episode #1.22
1988	Garfield and Friends	Girl (Voice)	1 episode
1989	A Peaceable Kingdom		1 episode
1990	Life Goes On	Tara Carlson	1 episode
1990	The Outsiders	Girl at party	1 episode
1991	Quantum Leap	Alexandra Rickett	1 episode
1991	Changes	Pam Hallam	Television movie
1991	The Wonder Years	Susan	1 episode
1991	The Family Man	Courtney	1 episode
1991	Empty Nest	Wanda Sue	1 episode
1991	Step by Step	Bernice	1 episode
1995	CBS Schoolbreak Special	Marla	1 episode
2021	Punky Brewster	Margaux Kramer	1 episode

== Awards and nominations ==
Year	Award	Result	Category	Film or series
1986	Young Artist Award	Nominated	Best Young Supporting Actress in a Television Series	Punky Brewster
1987	Young Artist Award	Nominated	Exceptional Performance by a Young Actress in a Long Running Series Comedy or Drama	Punky Brewster
1988	Young Artist Award	Nominated	Exceptional Performance by a Young Actress in a Television Comedy Series	Punky Brewster
1988	Young Artist Award	Nominated	Best Young Actress Starring in a Television Drama Special, Movie of the Week or Variety Show	Circus of the Stars #12
1988	Young Artist Award	Nominated	Best Animation Voice Over Group	It's Punky Brewster (Shared with Casey Ellison, Teddy Field III, Soleil Moon Frye, and Cherie Johnson)
1988	Young Artist Award	Nominated	Best Animation Voice Over Group	Pound Puppies
1989	Young Artist Award	Nominated	Best Young Actress – Voice Over Role	This Is America, Charlie Brown
1992	Young Artist Award	Nominated	Best Young Actress Guest Starring or Recurring Role in a TV Series	Empty Nest
