= Casey Ellison =

American actor (b. 1976)

- Born: March 2, 1976 (age 50); United States
- Occupation: Actor
- Years active: 1984–2002

Casey Ellison (born March 2, 1976, in the United States) is a former American actor who is known for his role as Allen Anderson on the NBC sitcom Punky Brewster. In 1986, he left the show and never appeared in the new 2021 revival.

== Career ==
Ellison had a recurring minor role on Mr. Belvedere (as Wesley's nerdy friend Miles), and has also guest-starred on episodes of Newhart, 21 Jump Street, and The Wonder Years. His last acting role was in the 2002 horror film Head Hunter.

== Filmography ==
Film
Year	Film	Role	Notes
2002	Head Hunter	Pete	Direct-to-DVD release
Television
Year	Title	Role	Notes
1984–1986	Punky Brewster	Allen Anderson	24 episodes
1985–1986	It's Punky Brewster	Allen Anderson	Voice, 26 episodes
1985–1988	Mr. Belvedere	Miles Knobnoster	10 episodes, plus 1 as a different character
1986	Foofur	Voice	4 episodes
1987	Newhart		1 episode
1989	The Ryan White Story	Heath	Television film
1989	21 Jump Street	Young Jack Archer	1 episode
1989	CBS Schoolbreak Special	Karl	1 episode
1989	The Munsters Today	Brad Penmann	1 episode
1990	The Wonder Years	Mark Bernstein	1 episode
1991	Perfect Harmony	Orville	Television film
1991	Christmas on Division Street	Derek Withers	Television film

== Award nominations ==
Year	Award	Result	Category	Series
1986	Young Artist Awards	Nominated	Best Young Supporting Actor in a Television Series	Punky Brewster
1988	Young Artist Awards	Nominated	Best Animation Voice Over Group	It's Punky Brewster (Shared with Teddy Field III, Ami Foster, Soleil Moon Frye, and Cherie Johnson)
