= We Can Be Heroes (2020 film) =

2020 superhero film by Robert Rodriguez

- Netflix release poster
- Directed by: Robert Rodriguez
- Written by: Robert Rodriguez
- Produced by: Racer Rodriguez; Robert Rodriguez
- Starring: YaYa Gosselin; Lyon Daniels; Andy Walken; Hala Finley; Lotus Blossom; Dylan Henry Lau; Andrew Diaz; Isaiah Russell-Bailey; Akira Akbar; Nathan Blair; Vivien Lyra Blair; Priyanka Chopra
- Cinematography: Robert Rodriguez
- Edited by: Robert Rodriguez
- Music by: Rebel Rodriguez
- Production company: Double R Productions
- Distributed by: Netflix
- Release date: December 25, 2020 (United States)
- Running time: 100 minutes
- Country: United States
- Language: English

We Can Be Heroes is a 2020 American superhero film written and directed by Robert Rodriguez. It is a sequel to the 2005 film The Adventures of Sharkboy and Lavagirl. Rodriguez was also the cinematographer and editor of the film, which stars YaYa Gosselin, Lyon Daniels, Andy Walken and Hala Finley. It was released on December 25, 2020, by Netflix and received mixed reviews from critics.

== Plot ==
Missy Moreno is at home with her dad, Marcus, when they receive word to come to the rescue of heroes where Missy has to go with her father and be with other Heroics children.

Missy meets these other children there:

- Wheels, who possesses super-strength, but his muscles are too heavy for his skeletal system to support.
- Noodles, who can stretch his body.
- Ojo, who is mute and communicates through art.
- A-Capella, who can telekinetically manipulate objects by singing.
- Slo-Mo, who is always in slow motion, due to being in a time warp.
- Face Maker, who can morph his face into anyone.
- Rewind and Fast Forward, twins who can alter time.
- Wild Card, who has immense powers but no control over it.
- Guppy, who has "shark strength" and can shape water into anything she can imagine.

The kids watch the battle between the aliens and Heroics on television, ending with the Heroics' capture. Missy realizes that Ojo's drawings tell the future. When a drawing shows aliens breaking into the vault, the kids hatch a plan to escape.

Face Maker tricks the guards into coming into the vault where Guppy subdues them, but not before one of the guards triggers an emergency lockdown. Rewind sends them back in time, Wheels stops the guard from pushing the button, and Noodles steals their security badges. Mrs. Granada spots Missy in the hallway and seals the doors, but A-Capella makes a staircase to the roof, allowing them to escape. Noodles secures a vehicle, and the kids escape. A Capella's voice raises, which makes the train wobble.

They land at the home of Missy's grandmother, Anita Moreno, who is the Heroics' trainer and helps the kids master their powers and work as a team. The aliens arrive and Grandma sends the kids through a tunnel that leads to an empty field before she is captured. The kids spot an empty alien craft and use it to reach the Mother ship. Locating a room with a purple pyramid, they see the president and Ms. Granada speaking. They are alien spies, sent to prepare Earth for a "takeover". The kids are placed in a cell. Guppy makes a replica of the key from the children's tears and opens the door. A fight between the kids and the aliens ensues, and Wild Card is caught and taken for questioning while the others seek the pyramid.

Wheels hacks into the motherboard, but Ojo reveals that she can speak and is the Supreme Commander of the aliens. Missy communicates with Wild Card in the control room; Face Maker has switched places with him. Granada goes after Wild Card, but not before the protective shield around the motherboard is deactivated. With the kids holding off the aliens, Wheels and Noodles remove the motherboard and swap it with a new one deactivating the alien's rocket and foiling the takeover. To the kids' surprise, their parents emerge from the rocket. Ojo reveals that she and Ms. Granada faked the "takeover" to train the kids to be the new Heroics. The kids reunite with their parents and are soon ready to save the world.

== Cast ==
- YaYa Gosselin as Missy Moreno, Marcus's powerless daughter and Anita's granddaughter.
- Hala Finley as Ojo, a girl who can draw the future.
- Lyon Daniels as Noodles, the son of Invisi Girl who can stretch his limbs.
- Nathan Blair as Wild Card, the son of Tech-No who has a randomized order of abilities and powers.
- Andy Walken as Wheels, the son of Miracle Guy.
- Lotus Blossom as A Capella, the daughter of Ms. Vox.
- Dylan Henry Lau as Slo-Mo, the son of Blinding Fast.
- Vivien Lyra Blair as Guppy, the youngest daughter of Sharkboy and Lavagirl. She was named after the fish itself.
- Isaiah Russell-Bailey as Rewind, the son of Crimson Legend and Red Lightning Fury and the twin brother of Fast Forward.
- Akira Akbar as Fast Forward, the daughter of Crimson Legend and Red Lightning Fury and the twin sister of Rewind.
- Andrew Diaz as Facemaker, the son of Crushing Low.
- Priyanka Chopra as Ms. Granada, the leader of the Heroics Program.
- Adriana Barraza as Anita Moreno, Marcus' mother and Missy's grandmother.
- Pedro Pascal as Marcus Moreno, the father of Missy and the son of Anita, a superhero, and master swordsman. His power is a magnetic force emitted from his hands, which allows him to keep a constant grip on his blades. He is the leader of The Heroics team of superheroes.
- Boyd Holbrook as Miracle Guy, a superhero with super strength.
- Christian Slater as Tech-No, a superhero with technology powers.
- Taylor Dooley as Lavagirl, a superheroine with lava-based powers. Dooley reprised her role from The Adventures of Sharkboy and Lavagirl in 3-D.
- Sung Kang as Blinding Fast, a superhero with super-speed.
- Haley Reinhart as Ms. Vox, a superhero with a sonar scream.
- JJ Dashnaw as Sharkboy, a superhero with shark-based powers, in a silent role due to Taylor Lautner, the original actor, who played Sharkboy in The Adventures of Sharkboy and Lavagirl in 3-D, being unavailable. Because of this, his face is obscured.
- Christopher McDonald as Neil Anami, the President of the United States.
- J. Quinton Johnson as Crimson Legend, a superhero who can make solar explosions.
- Brittany Perry-Russell as Red Lightning Fury, a superhero with lightning powers.
- Jamie Perez as Invisi Girl, a superhero with invisibility powers.
- Brently Heilbron as Crushing Low, a superhero with super-strength.
- Racer Rodriguez as a Helicopter Pilot. Rodriguez previously portrayed Sharkboy at age 8 and was the head of the story in The Adventures of Sharkboy and Lavagirl in 3-D.

== Production ==
Robert Rodriguez wrote, directed, and produced We Can Be Heroes through his Troublemaker Studios. Priyanka Chopra Jonas, along with Christian Slater and Pedro Pascal, were announced to star. Principal photography began in August 2019, shooting in Texas. Visual effects and animation were provided by Industrial Light & Magic (ILM) and Weta Digital. The score was recorded at Synchron Stage in Vienna.

== Release ==
The film was released on December 25, 2020, pushed forward from a January 1, 2021, release date.

== Reception ==
=== Audience viewership ===
Upon its release, the film was the most-watched title in its opening weekend, then finished third the following weekend before returning to first in its third weekend. It finished second behind new Netflix release Outside the Wire in its fourth weekend. It was revealed that the film has been seen in 53 million households during the first four weeks. It was the most-watched film on Netflix in 2021.

=== Critical response ===
On review aggregator Rotten Tomatoes, the film has an approval rating of 74% based on 46 reviews, with an average rating of 6/10. The site's consensus reads, "Although it may be too zany for adults, We Can Be Heroes balances its sophisticated themes with heart and zealous originality." On Metacritic, the film has a weighted average score of 51 out of 100, based on reviews from 10 critics, indicating "mixed or average reviews".

David Ehrlich of IndieWire called it a "zany, imaginative, and extremely kid-oriented Avengers riff that combines major stars with Snapchat-level special effects in order to lend a live-action Saturday morning cartoon vibe to a story about seizing your own destiny, We Can Be Heroes is the ultimate Troublemaker movie."

== Future ==
In January 2021, Netflix announced they are planning to develop a sequel. By August, Rodriguez confirmed that he would return in his role as director, while announcing that principal photography would take place in 2022.
