= Catherine Senitt =

Catherine Senitt (born 1945) is a Canadian painter and inventor of Wrinkles dogs. Her works are in the permanent collections of a number of major Canadian public galleries, though she has not publicly exhibited since 1979.

== Life and work ==
Senitt grew up in Rochester, New York, and studied in the School of Art and Design at the Rochester Institute of Technology. Her talents were recognized early through the receipt of the John A. Varney Award in 1964. In 1966, at the age of 21, she won Best Female Artist in the Finger Lakes Exhibit.

After her third year at the School of Art and Design, she emigrated to Canada in 1966. She settled in Toronto for the first 9 months and then moved to a school house near Fergus, Ontario.

During the late 1960s, she developed a successful painting career in Toronto using the name Cathy Senitt-Harbison. She showed her work at Pollock Gallery in 1967, where owner Jack Pollock also represented such artists as Ken Danby, David Hockney, and Willem de Kooning. She continued to be represented there through 1975 and the Merton Gallery from 1977 to 1978.

Senitt was awarded her first Canada Council Arts Grant in 1968.

Senitt's work was chosen to be part of the "Man and His World" exhibit in the grounds of the 1967 International and Universal Exposition (Expo 67) in Montreal. Senitt was selected to join Canada's pavilion at Expo 70 in Osaka, Japan. She was included in the inaugural show of the newly renamed Art Gallery of Ontario.

The January 1969 issue of Maclean's Magazine featured an uncredited image of a paper mache sculpture Senitt had made of Pierre Trudeau in the form of a jack-in-the-box. A 1974 feature article in the Toronto Star painted a rich picture of Senitt's life at the time, showing the schoolhouse she lived in, as well as a photograph of her painting while sitting on the floor. A photograph of her painted bottles states that they sold for $30–50 at the Pollock gallery. A feature on Jack Pollock (owner of the Pollock Gallery in Toronto) in Home Decor/Canada (February 1981) has several pictures of painted cupboards and tables in his house, painted by Senitt, but mistakenly credited to Bennet-Harbison from the Maritimes in the article.

In the late 1970s, Senitt developed the Wrinkles plush toy along with many other animal puppets. Around 1980, she left her art career to move to Carnarvon, Ontario, where she focused on raising her four children. At this time, Senitt patented a number of these toys, and formed Senitt Puppets to manufacture them. They were licensed to Ganz Brothers, and in 1986 to Coleco for distribution in the US.

Her work is known for its creativity and sophisticated use of naive forms. Many of her works incorporate unusual human forms, and various series have focused variously on abstract portraiture, her pet Red Dog, and hybrid human-animal forms reminiscent of Hieronymous Bosch or Gauguin. The Globe and Mail critic Kay Kritzwiser compared Senitt to "...Renaissance painters such as Grunewald (for whom she admits a worship) and Hieronymous Bosch (who impresses but does not inspire her.)" Senitt currently lives and works in Guelph, Ontario, Canada.

== Collections ==
Senitt's paintings are held in the following permanent collections:

- Art Gallery of Ontario
- Art Gallery of Windsor
- Art Gallery of Hamilton
- University of Saskatchewan
- Queen's University
- Trent University
- Seneca College
- Canada Council Art Bank

== Awards ==
- John A. Varney Award, Brockport, 1964
- Finger Lakes Exhibit, Best Female Artist, 1966
- Canada Council Grant 1968
- Childe Hassam Purchase Award, 1969
- Aviva Hadassah, First Prize, 1971 and 1972
- Canada Council Grant, 1974
- Ontario Arts Council Grant, 1975
- Ontario Arts Council Grant, 1979
