= The Spiderwick Chronicles (TV series) =

2024 American fanstasy television series

- Release poster
- Genre: Fantasy
- Created by: Aron Eli Coleite
- Based on: The Spiderwick Chronicles by: Tony DiTerlizzi; Holly Black
- Showrunner: Aron Eli Coleite
- Starring: Lyon Daniels; Noah Cottrell; Mychala Lee; Joy Bryant; Jack Dylan Grazer; Christian Slater
- Country of origin: United States
- Original language: English
- No. of seasons: 1
- No. of episodes: 8

Production
- Executive producers: Aron Eli Coleite; Tony DiTerlizzi; Holly Black; Ellen Goldsmith-Vein; Jeremy Bell; D.J. Goldberg; Julie Kane-Ritsch; Kat Coiro
- Producers: Grace Gilroy; Bruce Dunn
- Production location: Vancouver, Canada
- Running time: 45 minutes
- Production companies: Lightbulb Farm Productions; The Gotham Group; 20th Television; Paramount Television Studios

Original release
- Network: The Roku Channel
- Release: April 19, 2024

The Spiderwick Chronicles is an American fantasy television series based on the book series of the same name by Tony DiTerlizzi and Holly Black. The series stars Joy Bryant, Noah Cottrell, Lyon Daniels, Mychala Lee, Jack Dylan Grazer and Christian Slater, and follows the Grace family, who move into their ancestral home and unravel a dark mystery about their great-uncle, who discovered the parallel and secret world of fairies.

The Spiderwick Chronicles consists of eight episodes and premiered on the Roku Channel on April 19, 2024, to mixed reviews from critics, with praise for its visuals and Slater's performance, but some criticism for its writing, pacing, character development and deviations from the source material.

== Premise ==
Helen and her children, 15-year-old fraternal twins Jared and Simon and their sister Mallory move to their ancestral home, Spiderwick. Jared discovers a boggart and realizes that magical creatures are real. The only one to believe him is his great-aunt Lucinda who implores Jared to find the pages of her father's field guide to magical creatures and protect them from the murderous Ogre, Mulgarath.

== Cast and characters ==
=== Main ===
- Lyon Daniels as Jared Grace, Simon's older twin brother
- Noah Cottrell as Simon Grace, Jared's younger twin brother
- Mychala Lee as Mallory Grace, older sister of Jared and Simon
- Joy Bryant as Helen Grace, the mother of Mallory, Jared and Simon
- Jack Dylan Grazer as Thimbletack
- Christian Slater as Mulgarath

=== Recurring ===
- Momona Tamada as Emiko
- Alyvia Alyn Lind as Calliope
- Hunter Dillon as Hatcher
- Charlayne Woodard as Lucinda Spiderwick
- Albert Jones as Arthur Spiderwick
- Aria Mia Loberti as Valentina
- Mellany Barros as Bree Kent
- Dylan Bruce as Tanner Kent
- Arlene Duncan as Melvina

== Episodes ==
No.	Title	Directed by	Written by	Original release date
1	"Welcome to Spiderwick"	Kat Coiro	Aron Eli Coleite	April 19, 2024
In the prologue, Dr. Dorian Brauer meets with the ogre Mulgarath to secure the release of his daughter Calliope. However, Calliope has been replaced by a fetch. Brauer is devoured by a troll and Mulgarath assumes his form and identity. In the present, Helen Grace and her teenage children Mallory, Jared and Simon Grace relocate from Brooklyn, New York to their ancestral Spiderwick estate in Henson, Michigan following a divorce. Helen seeks mental health treatment for the troubled Jared, who has oppositional defiance disorder. While adapting to their new home, the Grace family, particularly Jared, experience several unexplained incidents including the disappearance of Simon's pet mice and Mallory's sword being damaged. Mallory is rejected by her sword training instructor Valentine. Helen visits her Aunt Lucinda at Meskawki mental health hospital but the latter experiences an apparent psychiatric breakdown. After Jared encounters the boggart Thimbletack in the attic, his disbelieving mother takes him for an urgent meeting with "Dr. Brauer."
2	"The Field Guide to the Fantastical World Around You"	Kat Coiro	Aron Eli Coleite	April 19, 2024
Jared begins counselling sessions with "Dr. Brauer" while Calliope befriends the Grace children. Aunt Lucinda flees from Meskawki hospital, prompting Helen and "Dr Brauer" to organize a search. During the search, "Dr. Brauer" takes the opportunity to ingratiate himself with Helen, who is bitter towards her ex-husband Richard. While hiding in a supermarket, Lucinda encounters a fairy. Meanwhile, Jared attempts to convince his skeptical siblings and Calliope that there is a boggart inside the Spiderwick mansion by using a surveillance system. Jared is blamed after an unseen force ties Mallory's hair and kills Simon's pet mice Lemondrop and Jeffrey. Simon and Jared later encounter Aunt Lucinda and Thimbletack in the late Arthur Spiderwick's study. She tasks Jared and Simon with recovering her father's Field Guide before Mulgarath can recover it. Shortly later, Helen and "Dr Brauer" arrive to bring Lucinda back to the hospital. While driving back to the hospital, Lucinda reveals that she knows that "Dr. Brauer" is actually Mulgarath and that Calliope is his accomplice, who framed Jared. Mulgarath seemingly kills Aunt Lucinda, who disintegrates into flowers.
3	"I Will Survive"	Michael Patrick Jann	Dennis Saldua	April 19, 2024
The Grace family organize a funeral for Aunt Lucinda, who is believed to have died of a heart attack. In secret, Calliope has impersonated Lucinda's corpse following her disintegration. Mulgarath, in his "Dr. Brauer" form, tasks Calliope with keeping the Grace family at the Spiderwick estate. Jared and Simon continue the search for the pages of Spiderwick's field guide, enlisting the help of Brauer's patients Emiko and Hatchet. Jared uses Lucinda's favorite music to unlock a fairy door containing a page of the field guide. Calliope also ingratiates herself with Simon. Mallory convinces one of Valentina's students Bree to be her sparring partner but discovers that Bree is conspiring with Valentina to eliminate her from an upcoming competition. Following an argument with Helen, Lucinda's estranged sister Melvina destroys the field guide's page in a fit of rage. While attempting to contact Thimbletack, Jared sustains a broken arm and is admitted to Meskawki hospital. He serves "Dr. Brauer" cookies laced with iron, exposing him as Mulgarath.
4	"Tastes like Chicken"	Amanda Row	Jasmyne Peck	April 19, 2024
Bree's father Tanner leads a protest calling for the closure of Meskawki mental hospital, claiming the patients are dangerous. Helen, who has become the hospital's librarian, defends "Dr. Brauer" after Tanner assaults him. Emiko protects Jared by claiming responsibility for vandalizing Brauer's car with graffiti. Helen also learns that Meskawki hospital was built in honor of the indigenous Meskawki tribe, who saved settlers from a mass hysteria eating frenzy caused by the demonic Mulgarath. The Grace twins, Emiko and Hatchet capture Thimbletack and form a truce to collect the pages of Spiderwick's field guide. While attempting to summon Lucinda from the spiritual realm, Jared accidentally summons a mushroom sprite. Jared strikes Simon following an argument, damaging the brothers' relationship. Hurt, Simon attends dinner with Calliope and "Dr. Brauer." Meanwhile, Mallory attends a ball at a former factory with Bree and her boyfriend Chris. There, she confronts Bree about her duplicity and discovers the fairy realm. Mulgarath infects Henson's water supply with a sleeping spell, causing several teenagers at the ball including Chris and Emiko to fall unconscious.
5	"A Midsummer's Daydream"	Rachel Raimist	Jenn Kao	April 19, 2024
Mulgarath plans to breed dragons and feed Henson's inhabitants to them. In response, Jared and Thimbletack search for the Spiderwick journal entry on dragons. Though they recover the journal, Jared is dismayed to discover that Helen has developed romantic feelings for "Dr. Brauer"; echoing Thimbletack's warning that the people he loves will love him. With the help of Calliope, Simon runs away to New York to find his father Richard Grace. After the two escape a cannibalistic Chinese Kitchen God, a distraught Simon discovers that Richard is not interested in his children. Despite Simon learning of Calliope's supernatural nature as a Fetch, the two reach an understanding. Meanwhile, Mallory realizes that Jared was telling the truth about fairies and tries to mend bridges with him. She also confronts Valentina, who is a human-nymph hybrid with knowledge of the fairy realm. Valentina offers to share her secrets if Mallory defeats her in a duel. Though Mallory is unable to beat Valentina, she convinces her to relent by expressing her love for her family.
6	"1028 Teeth"	Charles Randolph-Wright	Hannah Ahn & Charlie Paulin	April 19, 2024
At the Henson townhall meeting, Mulgarath in his "Dr Brauer" guise infects Tanner with a zombie fungus, causing him to drop his petition to close Meskawki hospital. Jared has a falling out with Simon, whom he believes is siding with Mulgarath and Calliope. With Mulgarath's dragons dying, Simon attempts to recover the dragon page but is trapped by Thimbletack. Meanwhile, Valentina reveals that she attempted to kill Mulgarath but lost her hands. Bree also reveals that her mother was murdered by Mulgarath. Valentina tasks Mallory with recovering a magical sword that can kill Mulgarath from the Goblin Market. Mallory convinces an increasingly paranoid Jared to help her, Bree and Hatcher parley for the sword with a devious goblin merchant. However, the sword appears to be a hilt. Thinking they were scammed, Jared assaults Hatchet, destroying his therapy helmet. "Dr. Brauer" convinces Helen, who believes her son is becoming insane, to commit Jared to psychiatric treatment. While Lucinda encourages Jared, the magical sword chooses Bree as its owner.
7	"The Field Guide to Jared Grace"	Aron Eli Coleite	Aron Eli Coleite	April 19, 2024
Jared is detained as a patient at Meskawki Hospital where Mulgarath in his guise as "Dr. Brauer" attempts to coerce him into releasing the dragon page from Arthur Spiderwick's Field Guide under the guise of psychiatric treatment. Jared refuses to submit and attempts to escape. Mulgarath attempts to convince Jared that ogres are unfairly demonised and that Spiderwick is the villain. When Jared rejects Mulgarath's attempts to win him over, Mulgarath uses his shape shifting powers to impersonate Helen, Mallory, Richard, Hatch and Emiko in a series of psychiatric criticism sessions. Mistaking Simon for an illusion Jared snaps at him during a visit. Mulgarath discovers that Jared was hiding the dragon page inside his arm bandage. While Mallory, Simon and Thimbletack attempt to mend bridges, Helen discovers human fingers in "Dr. Brauer"'s fridge. She is cornered by Mulgarath.
8	"The Wrath of Mulgarath"	Maurice Marable	Jenn Kao & Aron Eli Coleite	April 19, 2024
Mulgarath has used his magic to put half of Henson under a sleeping spell and the other half into zombie fungus-controlled slaves. Having gained the pages of Spiderwick's Journal, Mulgrath uses milk to nourish the last remaining dragon egg, intending to feed the town's population to them. Jared escapes Meskawki Hospital with the help of Thimbletack, Mallory, Hatch, Bree, and Simon. Jared mends bridges with Simon following a tense conversation. Seeking to stop Mulgarath's plot, the youths infiltrate the Spiderwick mansion. To rescue Helen, Simon pretends to betray Jared and the others. With the help of Thimbletack, Jared and Helen use an invisibility potion to escape Mulgarath. Meanwhile, Simon and Calliope join forces to summon pixies who reverse Mulgarath's magic, freeing the townsfolk. Following a battle against Mulgarath, the Grace siblings and their friends use magic to summon a troll which seemingly devours Mulgarath. The Grace family decide to spare the surviving dragon hatchling. Mulgarath resurfaces and impersonates Jared. Unable to tell the two apart, Mallory uses the sword to accidentally banish the real Jared to the fairy realm where he encounters his ancestor Arthur Spiderwick.

== Production ==
=== Development ===
On November 12, 2021, it was announced that a television adaptation was in development for Disney+, with Aron Eli Coleite serving as writer and showrunner. The series would be a co-production between Paramount Television Studios (whose film division distributed the 2008 feature-length adaptation of the books) and 20th Television. Work on the series began by February 2022. In May 2022, Kat Coiro joined as an executive producer and director for the first two episodes. Tony DiTerlizzi and Holly Black, authors of The Spiderwick Chronicles, were also credited as executive producers.

=== Writing ===
For the television adaptation, Coilete, DiTerlizzi and Black gave the antagonistic Mulgarath a greater role in the story by having him manipulate the Grace family in the guise of Jared's therapist. Regarding the novels' original plot of the protagonists guarding Arthur Spiderwick's Field Guide from Mulgarath as tiresome, the producers came up with the idea of Jared, Simon and their friends embarking on a quest to recover the missing pages of the book across the first season's eight episodes. According to Coilete, DiTerlizzi and Black also convinced him to replace Mulgarath's goblin henchmen with an original character named Calliope, who would serve as someone who could interact with both Mulgarath and the human characters. Black based Calliope on Fetches, supernatural doubles who are associated with death in Irish folklore. According to Coilete, the producers regarded Calliope as a conflicted character torn between her loyalty to Mulgarath and her relationship with Simon rather than a clear-cut villain.

Coilete, DiTerlizzi and Black also wanted each of the Grace siblings to undergo a hero's journey. A key theme of Mallory Grace's journey involved her shifting from the selfish priorities of wanting to leave her family to embracing the heroic role of protecting her family. According to Coilete, the first season's cliffhanger ending and the set design of the Spiderwick estate was designed to lay the groundwork for a potential second season.

=== Casting ===
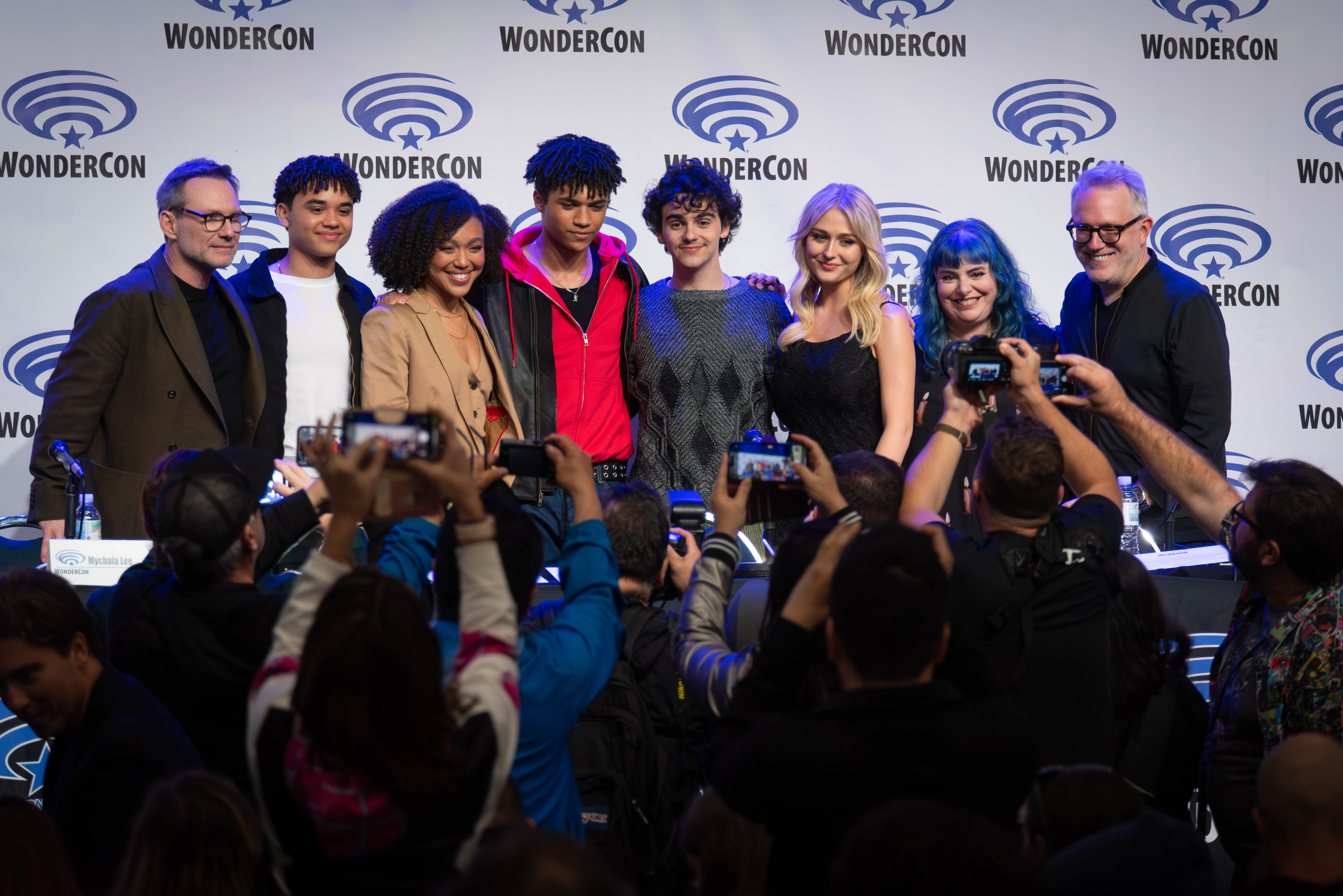
The main cast, along with original book authors Tony DiTerlizzi and Holly Black, at the 2024 WonderCon

Christian Slater joined the cast as Mulgarath in August 2022. He is reportedly set to appear only through the first season. While he was reportedly set to appear only through the first season, Coilete subsequently confirmed in April 2024 that Mulgarath could appear in a potential second season, which would explore his further plans. Later in August 2022, Lyon Daniels and Noah Cottrell were added to the cast as Jared and Simon Grace. On August 30, Joy Bryant joined the cast as Helen Grace. Mychala Lee joined as Mallory Grace in mid-September. Other notable cast members included Jack Dylan Grazer as Thimbletack and Alyvia Alyn Lind as Calliope.

=== Filming ===
Principal photography began on September 12, 2022, in Vancouver, Canada, and was scheduled to conclude on January 27, 2023.

== Release ==
The series was released in its entirety on April 19, 2024, on the Roku Channel, consisting of eight episodes. It was previously set to release on Disney+ consisting of six episodes, however in August 2023, Deadline reported that the series was no longer moving forward at Disney+ due to cost-cutting reasons, despite having been already completed, and would be shopped to other networks. In October 2023, Roku had picked up the U.S. exclusive rights to the series. According to showrunner Coleite, Roku was generally happy with the series and made no changes apart from adding a primer at the opening explaining the series.

In New Zealand, the series was released on TVNZ's streaming service TVNZ+.

By late April 2024, Roku reported that the Spiderwick Chronicles was the most watched title in the platform's history. While Roku did not provided viewership figures, it claimed that millions had watched the series during its opening weekend.

== Reception ==
=== Critical response ===
On review aggregator Rotten Tomatoes, 46% of 13 for the first season are positive, with an average rating of 4.9/10. The site's critical consensus read: "The Spiderwick Chronicles delivers a lackluster adaptation that's in need of greater imagination and purpose." Metacritic, which uses a weighted average, assigned a score of 48 out of 100 based on 7 critics, indicating "mixed or average reviews".

Arezou Amin of Collider gave the series a positive review, awarding the series 7 out of 10 stars. She praised the showrunners' decision to do away with the episodic format of the source material in favour of serialized storytelling, which made it easier for viewers unfamiliar with the original novels. Amin also praised the performance of the cast members particularly Christian Slater and Joy Bryant as Mulgarath and Helen Grace. She also praised the series' character development of the three Grace siblings and the incorporation of their sibling dynamics into the main story plot. However, Amin was also critical of the drawn-out nature of the Grace family conflict. She described the show's visual effects as "remarkable and realistic." Amin also observed that the series chose to emphasize horror over its fantasy elements, but criticised the inconsistent tone of the horror elements throughout the series.

Caroline Siede of The Daily Beast gave the series a critical review, criticizing the series for downplaying the fantasy elements of the source material in favor of contemporary issues such as teenage mental health struggles and family drama. Siede observed the lack of fantasy adventure elements such as fairies and goblins, which she attributed to budgetary restrictions rather than artistic choice. While critical of the series' fractured subplots, she praised the performances of Slater and Woodard.

Aramide Tinubu of Variety gave a predominantly critical review, stating that it "lacks the excitement and adventure" of the source material. While she praised the TV series adaptation for highlighting teenage issues such as dark thoughts, ostracization and perfectionism, she criticized its stalled story spacing, humdrum tone and the "unimaginative and lackluster" fantasy elements. Tinubu was also critical of the showrunners' decision to age the Grace brothers from preteens to teenagers but praised the series for exploring the dynamics between the Grace siblings and Alyvia Alyn Lind's character Calliope.

Emma Stefansky of IGN gave a critical review, stating that "this updated version of the beloved book series only captures traces of the magic." She was critical of the showrunners' decision to age up the main protagonists into teenagers and to de-emphasize the fantasy elements in favor of focusing on real-world issues such as absentee parents, dead relatives, and mental issues. However, Stefansky praised the incorporation of both modern American and international cultural references not found in the source material such as plantations, redlining, South American manchineel trees, Nazar amulets, and Native American wendigos.

=== Awards and nominations ===
Year	Award	Category	Recipient	Result	Ref.
2025	Children's and Family Emmy Awards	Outstanding Young Teen Series	The Spiderwick Chronicles	Nominated	
2025	Children's and Family Emmy Awards	Outstanding Lead Performer in a Preschool, Children's or Young Teen Program	Christian Slater	Won	
2025	Children's and Family Emmy Awards	Outstanding Younger Performer in a Preschool, Children's or Young Teen Program	Noah Cottrell	Nominated	
2025	Children's and Family Emmy Awards	Outstanding Writing for a Young Teen Program	Aron Eli Coleite (for "The Field Guide to Jared Grace")	Nominated	
2025	Children's and Family Emmy Awards	Outstanding Directing for a Single Camera Program	Kat Coiro (for "Welcome to Spiderwick")	Nominated	
2025	Children's and Family Emmy Awards	Outstanding Lighting, Camera and Technical Arts	Ian Levine, Tim Moynihan, David Tickell	Nominated	
2025	Children's and Family Emmy Awards	Outstanding Show Open	Jon Block, Dustin Frost, Jason Marconi, Dustin Reno, William Lebeda	Nominated	
2025	Children's and Family Emmy Awards	Outstanding Cinematography for a Live Action Single-Camera Program	Florian Ballhaus, Lindsay George, Jon Joffin, Alwyn Kumst	Nominated	
2025	Children's and Family Emmy Awards	Outstanding Editing for a Live Action Single-Camera Program	Nicole Brik, Gena Fridman, Rebekah Fridman, Mikki Levi, Lauren Schaffer	Nominated	
2025	Children's and Family Emmy Awards	Outstanding Sound Mixing and Sound Editing for a Live Action Program	Thomas E. de Gorter, Owen Granich-Young, Ian Tarasoff, Kevin Roache, Adam Sawelson, Thomas Milano, Jeena Schoenke, Michael O'Connor, Lyndsey Schenk, Noel Vought, Jacob Mcnaugton	Nominated	
2025	Children's and Family Emmy Awards	Outstanding Visual Effects for a Live Action Program	Gazzal Dhami, Andy Ritchie, Kim Savory, Jim Thompson, Michael Blackbourn, Mark Dubeau, Kerrington Harper, Curt Miller, Becky Philpott, Stephen Bahr, Paul Copeland	Nominated	
2025	Children's and Family Emmy Awards	Outstanding Casting for a Live Action Program	Denise Chamian and Liz Ludwitzke	Nominated	
2025	Children's and Family Emmy Awards	Outstanding Art Direction/Set Decoration/Scenic Design for a Single Camera Program	Andrew Li, Michael Corrado, Elena Albanese, Ide Foyle	Won	
