= Lyon Daniels =

American actor (born 2007)

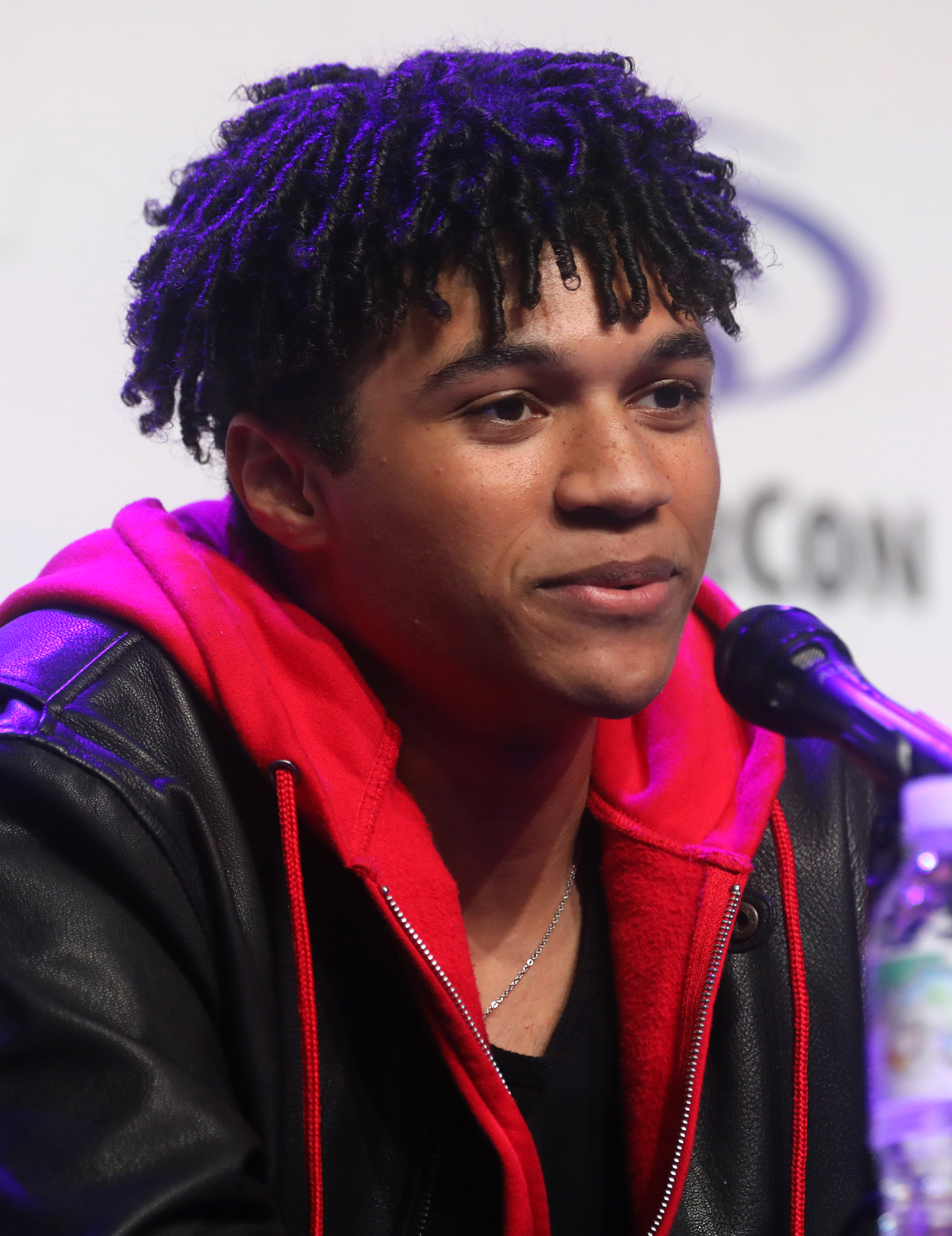
- Daniels in 2024
- Born: June 14, 2007 (age 18); Evanston, Illinois, U.S.
- Occupation: Actor
- Years active: 2015–present

Lyon Daniels (born June 14, 2007) is an American actor. He has starred as Noodles in the Netflix 2020 action-adventure film We Can Be Heroes. Since 2024, he has played the leading role of Jared Grace in the Roku original fantasy series The Spiderwick Chronicles that was originally ordered by Disney+.

== Early life ==
Lyon Daniels was born in Evanston, Illinois, a northern suburb of Chicago. His father Joe Daniels was the original founder and drummer of the popular '90s rock band Local H. As a child he did some modeling campaigns for clothing whilst he lived in Los Angeles. He also has two younger brothers, Rylan and Myles.

== Career ==
Daniels stars as a lead character “Jared Grace” in the Roku\Paramount+ live-action adaptation of the series The Spiderwick Chronicles, alongside Christian Slater and Joy Bryant. The critically-acclaimed fantasy adventure novels, which have sold 20 million copies in over 30 countries, are written by Tony DiTerlizzi and Holly Black. The Spiderwick Chronicles follows the coming-of-age story of the Grace family, as they move from New York to Michigan and into their family’s ancestral home revealing a contemporary American gothic coming-of-age story that addresses kids and families dealing with mental health issues among other relevant topics. The eight-episode series, originally ordered by Disney+, Paramount Television Studios and 20th Television, premiered on the Roku platform in early 2024. The Spiderwick Chronicles amassed 13 nominations at the Children's and Family Emmy Awards.

Daniels also stars in the critically-acclaimed Netflix film We Can Be Heroes, directed by Robert Rodriguez, as the superhero “Noodles.” The film held the record for the most-watched family film in Netflix's history; around 44 million households watched the movie within the first four weeks of its release on Netflix. He plays alongside Christian Slater for the second time, Priyanka Chopra, Sung Kang, Pedro Pascal and Boyd Holbrook. Netflix has announced that a sequel is in development.

For television, Daniels also created the recurring role of 'Efram' on the Amazon Prime Video series Patriot, opposite Michael Dorman, Terry O'Quinn and Michael Chernus.

Daniels will also be starring in Claire McCarthy’s upcoming film Shiver which stars Maddie Ziegler and Levi Miller.

Daniels was also signed by The Gersh Agency in June 2024.

== Personal life ==
When he is not acting, his hobbies include filming, directing, and editing his own movies, drawing, swimming, skateboarding, and playing the guitar.

== Filmography ==
=== Film ===
Year	Title	Role	Notes
2020	We Can Be Heroes	Noodles	
TBA	Shiver	TBA	Post-Production

=== Television ===
Year	Title	Role	Notes
2015	Patriot	Efram	
2024-present	The Spiderwick Chronicles	Jared Grace	Main Role
