= Soleil Moon Frye =

American actress (born 1976)

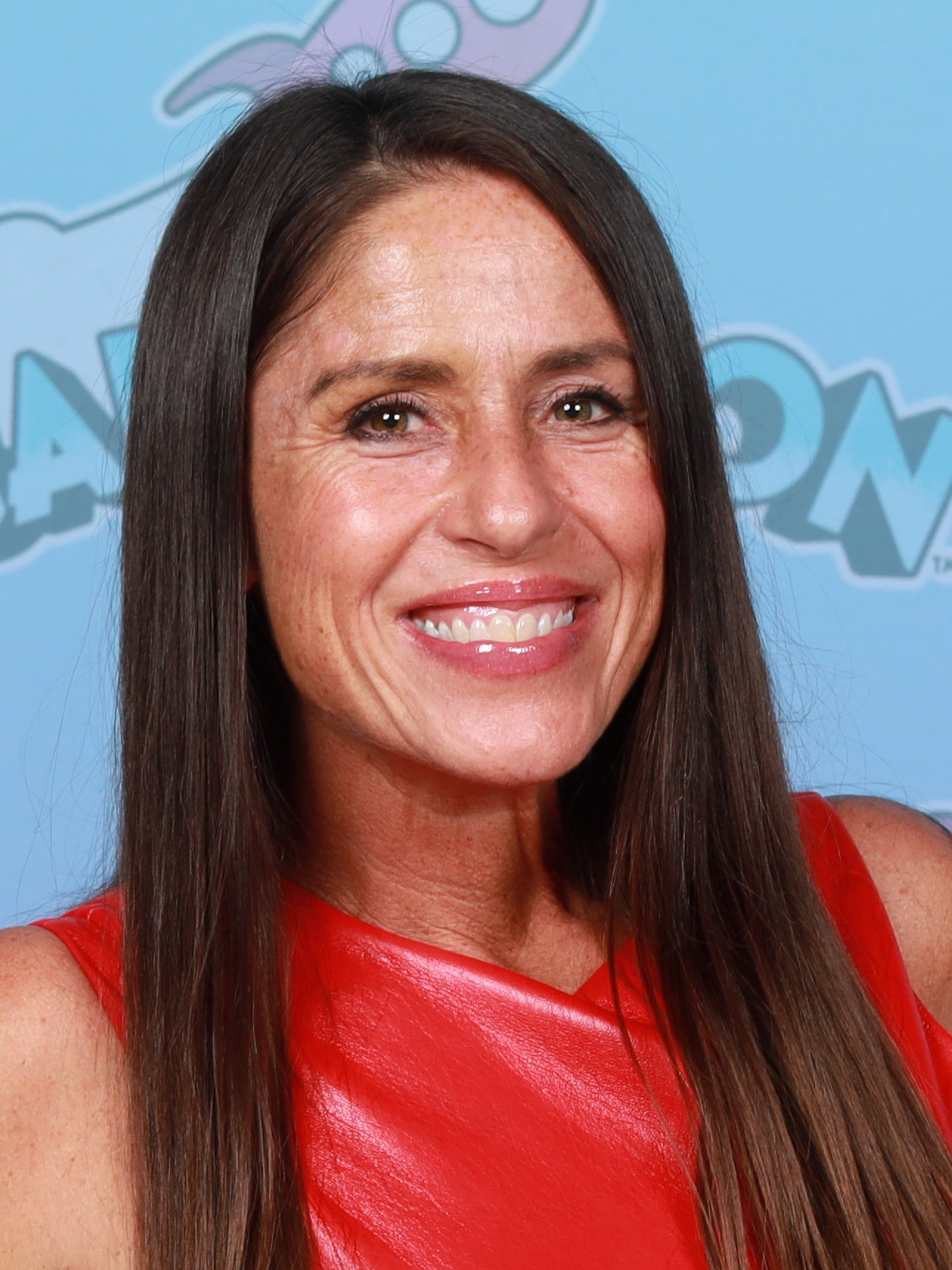
- Frye at GalaxyCon San Jose in 2025
- Born: August 6, 1976 (age 50); Glendora, California, U.S.
- Education: San Fernando Valley Professional School; The New School
- Occupations: Actress; director; screenwriter
- Years active: 1982–present
- Spouse: Jason Goldberg (m. 1998; div. 2022)
- Children: 4
- Father: Virgil Frye
- Relatives: Sean Frye (half-brother); Meeno Peluce (half-brother)

Soleil Moon Frye (/soʊˈleɪ/; born August 6, 1976) is an American actress. She began her career as a child actress at the age of two. When she was seven, Frye won the role of Penelope "Punky" Brewster in the NBC sitcom Punky Brewster. The series debuted in September 1984 and earned consistently low ratings, but the Punky character was a hit with young children. After NBC canceled the series, it was picked up for the syndication market where it aired for an additional two seasons before ending in 1988. Frye reprised the role in a 2021 revival of the series, which was canceled after one season.

After the original Punky Brewster series ended, Frye continued her career in guest spots on television and supporting roles in films. She attended The New School during the late 1990s and directed her first film, Wild Horses, in 1998. In 2000, she joined the cast in The WB sitcom Sabrina the Teenage Witch as Roxie King, Sabrina Spellman's roommate and close friend. Frye remained with the series until its end in April 2003. She has since continued her acting career working mainly as a voice actor where she is best known for voicing Zoey Howzer in the Proud Family franchise.

From 1998 to 2022, Frye was married to producer Jason Goldberg, with whom she has four children. From 2008 to 2012, she co-owned an eco-friendly specialty clothing boutique for children, The Little Seed, in Los Angeles. In 2011, Frye released her first book, Happy Chaos: From Punky to Parenting and My Perfectly Imperfect Adventures in Between. Frye was host of the Home Made Simple show on the Oprah Winfrey Network from 2013 to 2014.

== Early life ==
Frye was born in Glendora, California. Her father was actor Virgil Frye (1930–2012), and her mother is talent agent and caterer Sondra Peluce (née Londy). She has two half-brothers, Sean Frye and Meeno Peluce, both former child actors. Frye's parents divorced when she was two. She was raised in her mother's Jewish faith.

Frye was educated at a private school in Los Feliz and attended San Fernando Valley Professional School in Burbank.

== Career ==
=== Acting ===
Frye made her acting debut in the 1982 television movie Missing Children: A Mother's Story. In 1983, she had a supporting role in Who Will Love My Children?, another television movie starring Ann-Margret. The following year, she portrayed Elizabeth (Bette) Kovacs in the biographical television movie Ernie Kovacs: Between the Laughter, and appeared in another television movie, Invitation to Hell, directed by Wes Craven.

At an audition in 1984, Frye beat out over 3,000 girls (including her future Sabrina, the Teenage Witch co-star Melissa Joan Hart) to win the title role on the NBC sitcom Punky Brewster. The series, which was conceived by NBC's then-head of programming Brandon Tartikoff, premiered in September 1984. Scheduled opposite CBS's highly rated 60 Minutes, the series struggled in the ratings, but the character of Punky was popular among children. Frye routinely appeared at parades, participated in an anti-drug walks with then-First Lady Nancy Reagan, and was the honorary chairman for the National Institute on Drug Abuse. Frye also voiced and reprised the role in the animated series It's Punky Brewster, which began airing during Punky Brewster's first season. Despite the series' low ratings, Brandon Tartikoff decided to renew the show for a second season because it was the highest rated show watched by children 2 to 11 years old. Punky Brewster's second season, which dealt with more serious subject matters such as CPR and first-aid training, drug use and the Just Say No campaign, and the Space Shuttle Challenger disaster, did not improve ratings, and NBC canceled the series in April 1986. The series was quickly picked up by Columbia Pictures Television and began airing in first-run syndication. Punky Brewster aired for an additional two seasons, ending on May 27, 1988.

Immediately upon Punky Brewster's end, Frye landed the lead role in the ABC sitcom pilot Cadets, which aired as a summer special on September 25, 1988. The pilot, however, was not picked up. In 1989, Frye hosted the syndicated weekly talk/variety show Girl Talk. Based on the board game of the same name, Frye shared hosting duties with Sarah Michelle Gellar and Rod Brogan. The series was canceled after one season. In 1990, she appeared in the Rodney Dangerfield sitcom pilot ...Where's Rodney?, but this was not picked up as a series, either.

During the 1990s, Frye guest-starred on several television series, including The Wonder Years, Saved by the Bell, and Friends, and voiced characters for the animated series Tiny Toon Adventures, The Ren & Stimpy Show, and The Cartoon Cartoon Show (namely, the Johnny Bravo pilot episode). In addition to her television work, Frye has appeared in the films The Liars' Club (1993) and Pumpkinhead II: Blood Wings (1995) and in stage productions of Orestes, I Murdered My Mother and The Housekeeper.

From 2000 to 2003, Frye played the character of Roxie King in the last few seasons of Sabrina, the Teenage Witch, with her longtime friend and series producer Melissa Joan Hart. During the run of Sabrina, she voiced Zoey Howzer in the Disney Channel series The Proud Family and the series' 2005 television movie. She reprised the role in the revival series The Proud Family: Louder and Prouder.

In 2005, she voiced Jade, a Bratz character, in the direct-to-video release Bratz Rock Angelz. She also voiced the character for the television series and the video games Bratz Rock Angelz (2005), Bratz: Forever Diamondz (2006) and Bratz: The Movie (2007), and the follow-up movies until Bratz: Fashion 4 Passion – Diamondz. From 2010 to February 2013, Frye voiced Aseefa in the animated series Planet Sheen.

She appears in the Punky Brewster reboot that began airing on Peacock on February 25, 2021.

=== Directing ===
In 1996, Frye moved to New York to attend The New School and later directed her first film, Wild Horses (1998).

Frye directed her second film, Sonny Boy, in 2004. The documentary chronicles a two-week trip Frye took with her father, Virgil, who had Alzheimer's disease. Sonny Boy was an official selection at the 27th Starz Denver International Film Festival and won Best Documentary at the San Diego Film Festival.

In 2021, Frye directed Kid 90, a documentary film using an archive of footage she shot in the 1990s, for which Leonardo DiCaprio was executive producer. The film was released on March 12, 2021, by Hulu.

=== Other ventures ===
In 2007, Frye, along with two friends, opened The Little Seed, an eco-friendly children's specialty boutique in Los Angeles. The boutique closed in August 2012, and is now an Internet-based business.

In March 2010, Frye and her friend and former co-star Melissa Joan Hart launched the "Better Together" campaign for Gain.

In September 2011, Frye released her first book, Happy Chaos: From Punky to Parenting and My Perfectly Imperfect Adventures in Between. In October 2013, she released a party-planning book, Let's Get This Party Started. She also hosted a web series, Her Say, from 2011 to 2012, and currently hosts a blog on her official website, moonfrye.com, both of which deal with women's issues and parenting.

In 2014, Frye co-founded P.S. XO, a company that sells party decoration kits. The name was then changed to MoonFrye, and expanded to include DIY kits for families and an app of the same name. They later merged with the company Seedling, which specializes in "activity kits".

== Personal life ==
As a teen, Frye underwent a breast reduction three months before her 16th birthday.

In the 1990s, Frye was romantically involved with hip-hop artist Danny Boy O'Connor, with whom she remains friends.

On October 25, 1998, Frye married television producer Jason Goldberg in a Jewish ceremony (Frye is Jewish, as is Goldberg). Frye and Goldberg have four children: daughters born in August 2005 and March 2008 and sons born in February 2014 and May 2016. Goldberg and Frye renewed their marriage vows in a ceremony in 2008. However, in 2020, after 22 years of marriage, the couple separated. In December 2020, Frye filed for divorce. The divorce was finalized in April 2022.

In 2022, Frye dated childhood friend Shifty Shellshock of Crazy Town.

== Filmography ==
=== Film ===
| Year | Title | Role | Notes |
|---|---|---|---|
| 1987 | You Ruined My Life | Minerva | |
| 1993 | The Liars' Club | Gigi | |
| 1994 | The St. Tammany Miracle | Julia | Alternative title: Heavenly Hoops |
| 1994 | Pumpkinhead II: Blood Wings | Marcie | |
| 1995 | Twisted Love | Sharon Stewart | |
| 1996 | Mind Games | Becky Hanson | |
| 1998 | Wild Horses | – | Writer, director |
| 1999 | Motel Blue | Agent Kyle Rivers | |
| 2000 | The Girls' Room | Casey | Alternative title: Best of Enemies |
| 2001 | Alex in Wonder | Alissa | Alternative title: Sex and a Girl |
| 2004 | Sonny Boy | – | Director |
| 2005 | Bratz: Rock Angelz | Jade (voice) | Direct to DVD |
| 2006 | Bratz: Passion 4 Fashion - Diamondz | Jade (voice) | Direct to DVD |
| 2006 | Bratz: Genie Magic | Jade (voice) | Direct to DVD |
| 2013 | Bratz Go to Paris: The Movie | Jade (voice) | Direct to DVD |
| 2021 | Kid 90 | Herself | Director, producer; documentary |
| 2021 | The Cleaner | Kristi | |
| 2022 | Imaginary Friends | Bly | |
| 2026 | A Proud Family Wizmas | Zoey Howzer (voice) | |

=== Television ===
| Year | Title | Role | Notes |
|---|---|---|---|
| 1982 | Missing Children: A Mother's Story | Mary Elizabeth | TV movie |
| 1983 | CHiPs | Little Max | Episode "Firepower" |
| 1983 | Who Will Love My Children? | Linda Fray | TV movie |
| 1983 | Little Shots | Samantha | TV movie |
| 1984 | Ernie Kovacs: Between the Laughter | Elizabeth Kovacs #2 | TV movie |
| 1984 | Invitation to Hell | Chrissy Winslow | TV movie |
| 1984−1988 | Punky Brewster | Penelope "Punky" Brewster | Main role |
| 1985 | Diff'rent Strokes | Terry Harris | Episode: "Sam's New Pal" |
| 1985 | MacGruder and Loud | Kathy | Episode: "The Very Scary Man" |
| 1985 | Back to Next Saturday | Punky Brewster | Special |
| 1985 | It's Punky Brewster | Penelope "Punky" Brewster (voice) | Main role |
| 1986 | Alvin Goes Back to School | Punky Brewster | Special |
| 1987 | The Law & Harry McGraw | Charlene | Episode: "She's Not Wild About Harry" |
| 1988 | Cadets | Tyler McKay | Unsold pilot |
| 1989 | Girl Talk | Herself | TV pilot/show |
| 1990 | Where's Rodney? | Sonya | TV movie |
| 1990 | The Wonder Years | Mimi Detweiler | Episode: "Growing Up" |
| 1992 | Saved by the Bell | Robin | Episode: "Screech's Spaghetti Sauce" |
| 1992 | Tiny Toon Adventures | Amanda Duff (voice) | 2 episodes |
| 1992 | ABC Weekend Special | Tina | Episode: "Choose Your Own Adventure: The Case of the Silk King" |
| 1993 | The Ren & Stimpy Show | Susan Fout (voice) | Episode: "Stimpy's Fan Club" |
| 1994 | Summertime Switch | Peggy, the head cheerleader | TV movie |
| 1994 | Heaven Help Us | Louisa | Episode: "First Comes Love" |
| 1995 | Piranha | Laura Dickinson | TV movie |
| 1996 | The Cartoon Cartoon Show | Mary (voice) | Episode: "Johnny Bravo and the Amazon Women" |
| 1997 | The Killing Secret | Emily De Capprio | TV movie |
| 1998 | I've Been Waiting for You | Kyra Thompson | TV movie |
| 1999 | Working | Jen Miller | Episode: "The Prodigy" |
| 1999 | Friends | Katie | Episode: "The One with the Girl Who Hits Joey" |
| 1999 | Grown Ups | Robin | Episode: "Pilot" |
| 2000−2003 | Sabrina the Teenage Witch | Roxie King | Main role |
| 2001−2005 | The Proud Family | Zoey Howzer (voice) | Main role |
| 2005 | The Proud Family Movie | Zoey Howzer (voice) | TV movie |
| 2005 | The X's | Annasthesia, Seven Y (voices) | 3 episodes |
| 2005–2006 | Bratz | Jade | Main role |
| 2009 | Robot Chicken | Voice roles | 3 episodes |
| 2010 | Planet Sheen | Aseefa (voice) | 13 episodes |
| 2013–2014 | Home Made Simple | Herself | Host |
| 2017–2018 | Hollywood Darlings | Herself | 2 episodes |
| 2019 | Staging Christmas | Lori | TV movie |
| 2021 | Punky Brewster | Penelope "Punky" Brewster | Main role |
| 2022–2026 | The Proud Family: Louder and Prouder | Zoey Howzer (voice) | 17 episodes |

=== Video games ===
| Year | Title | Role | Notes |
|---|---|---|---|
| 2005 | Bratz: Rock Angelz | Jade | Voice role |
| 2006 | Bratz: Forever Diamondz | Jade | Voice role |
| 2007 | Bratz: The Movie | Jade | Voice role |

== Awards and nominations ==
| Year | Award | Category | Title of work | Result |
|---|---|---|---|---|
| 1985 | Young Artist Award | Best Young Actress in a Television Comedy Series | Punky Brewster | Nominated |
| 1986 | Young Artist Award | Best Young Actress Starring in a Television Series | Punky Brewster | Won |
| 1988 | Young Artist Award | Best Young Female Superstar in Television | Punky Brewster | Nominated |
| 1988 | Young Artist Award | Best Animation Voice Over Group | It's Punky Brewster (Shared with Casey Ellison, Ami Foster, Teddy Field III, and Cherie Johnson) | Nominated |
| 1989 | Young Artist Award | Best Young Actress Guest Starring in a Syndicated Family Comedy, Drama or Special | Mickey's 60th Birthday | Nominated |
| 1989 | Young Artist Award | Best Young Actress - Voice Over Role | It's Punky Brewster | Won |
| 2004 | San Diego Film Festival | Best Documentary | Sonny Boy | Won |
