= Punky Brewster =

American sitcom television series (1984–1988)

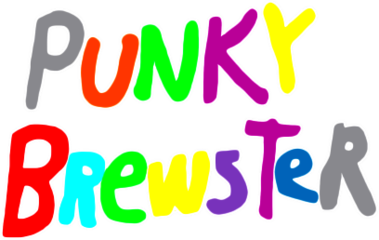
- Genre: Sitcom
- Created by: David W. Duclon
- Directed by: Art Dielhenn (seasons 1–2); Various (seasons 1, 3–4)
- Starring: George Gaynes; Soleil Moon Frye; Susie Garrett (Note: Added to opening credits in season 2); Cherie Johnson; T. K. Carter (Note: Added to opening credits in season 2 (but only for that season))
- Theme music composer: Gary Portnoy; Judy Hart Angelo
- Opening theme: "Every Time I Turn Around" performed by Gary Portnoy
- Country of origin: United States
- Original language: English
- No. of seasons: 4
- No. of episodes: 86 (list of episodes)

Production
- Executive producer: David W. Duclon
- Producers: Rick Hawkins; Liz Sage
- Camera setup: Videotape; Multi-camera
- Running time: 24 minutes (NBC episodes); 22 minutes (Syndication episodes)
- Production companies: Lightkeeper Productions; NBC Productions (Note: 1984–1986 (seasons 1–2)); Coca-Cola Telecommunications (Note: 1987 (season 3)); Columbia Pictures Television (Note: 1988 (season 4))

Original release
- Network: NBC
- Release: September 16, 1984 – March 9, 1986
- Network: Syndication
- Release: October 30, 1987 – May 27, 1988

Related
- It's Punky Brewster; Punky Brewster

Punky Brewster is an American sitcom television series created by David W. Duclon. It aired on NBC from September 16, 1984, to March 9, 1986, and again in syndication from October 30, 1987, to May 27, 1988. The show centers around a young girl, Penelope "Punky" Brewster, being raised by a foster parent Henry Warnimont in Chicago.

The series later spawned an animated spin-off, It's Punky Brewster, with the original cast voicing their respective characters.

NBC broadcast a 10-episode revival on its Peacock streaming service in 2021. Frye returned, as did original cast member Cherie Johnson.

== Synopsis ==
Penelope "Punky" Brewster (Soleil Moon Frye) is a warm, funny, and bright child. Her father walked out on her family, then her mother abandoned her at a Chicago shopping center when they were shopping for groceries, leaving Punky alone with her dog, Brandon. Afterwards, Punky discovers a vacant apartment in a local building.

The building is managed by 60-year-old Henry Warnimont (George Gaynes), a widowed photographer with a grumpy streak who finds Punky in the abandoned apartment. Punky explains things to him and he decides to take Punky in. Punky hits it off with young Cherie Johnson (played by Cherie Johnson), who lives in Henry's building with her grandmother, Betty (Susie Garrett). Betty works as a registered nurse at Cook County Hospital.

The relationship between the two blossoms, despite red tape from social worker Randi Mitchell (Talia Balsam), who ultimately rallies to Henry's side. The state forces Punky to stay at Fenster Hall, an emergency shelter for orphaned and abandoned children, until their day in court. The court approves Henry's wish to become Punky's foster father. Henry legally adopts her in the second season.

Punky's other friends are geeky Allen Anderson (Casey Ellison) and spoiled rich girl Margaux Kramer (Ami Foster). During the NBC run, Punky's teachers were regularly seen, in the first season, cheerful Mrs. Morton (Dody Goodman) and in the second season, hip Mike Fulton (T. K. Carter). Mike formed a close relationship with Punky and her friends, and was also portrayed as a social crusader of sorts.

=== Season 1 (1984–1985) ===
During the first season, Margaux's socialite mother (Loyita Chapel) appeared on a recurring basis, as did kooky maintenance man Eddie Malvin (Eddie Deezen). Eddie disappeared after the first several episodes.

Beginning in 1984, NBC aired the sitcom on Sundays. Because the show had many young viewers and was scheduled after football games (which tended to run long), six fifteen-minute episodes were produced. This was done rather than joining a full-length episode in progress, so as not to disappoint children watching the program.

=== Season 2 (1985–1986) ===
The second season's February 2, 1986, episode introduced the first installment of a five-part storyline. In the five-part episode "Changes", Henry's downtown photography studio was destroyed in a fire, and for a time, he seemingly would not be able to recover from the aftermath and resume his career. As a result of his stress, Henry ended up hospitalized for a bleeding ulcer.

During that time, Betty and Cherie made arrangements for Punky to stay with them until Henry recovered. Everyone's stability was halted when bureaucratic social worker Simon P. Chillings (guest star Timothy Stack) arrived, found out about Henry's condition, and deemed the worst; he found Betty unsuitable to care for Punky because Punky would not have her own room. Chillings also felt that Henry was unfit to be Punky's legal guardian in the long term due to his health, age, and uncertain financial future. Chillings made Punky a ward of the state yet again, and she returned to Fenster Hall.

Punky's efforts to escape from Fenster included a trick pulled by Margaux, in which she dressed up and pretended to be Punky. Despite advocacy from Mike Fulton, Chillings placed Punky with a new foster family, the fabulously wealthy Jules and Tiffany Buckworth (Robert Casper and Joan Welles), the latter of whom did not take kindly at all to Punky's working-class playfulness. Things gradually returned to normal. Henry, back on his feet following surgery, opened up a glitzy new studio at the local mall; in the process, he reunited with Punky. At the conclusion of the story arc, Henry officially adopted Punky.

The final episode of the second season was notable for centering on the very recent, real-life Space Shuttle Challenger disaster. Punky and her classmates watched the live coverage of the shuttle launch in Mike Fulton's class. After the accident occurred, Punky is traumatized; her dreams of becoming an astronaut are crushed. Her teacher Mike then brings over former NASA astronaut Buzz Aldrin to visit Punky. NBC cancelled the show soon after.

=== Syndication (1987–1988) ===
After two seasons, NBC saw that Punky Brewster and its principal Sunday night stablemate, the four-year-old Silver Spoons, could not compete as strongly as they hoped against CBS's juggernaut 60 Minutes, and cancelled both programs. Like many cult-favorite sitcoms of the time, Punky Brewster was revived for syndication (as was Silver Spoons). Production on Punky went undelayed, and its third season began shooting on schedule. While the show was in production throughout the 1986–87 season, it did not return to the air via syndication until October 30, 1987. Beginning on that premiere date, Punky was packaged such that new episodes would air every weekday (usually late in the afternoon on independent stations). The entire third season (1986–87) aired in the five-days-a-week format through December 8, 1987.

By the syndicated run, the storylines had clearly started to mature. Many more of Punky and Cherie's friends were seen (although most only made a handful of guest appearances each), with Margaux becoming their comic foil and source of friction. Early in the third season, Allen moved away to Kansas with his mother, following his parents' divorce. As Punky herself neared junior high, her avant-garde day-glo and multicolored attire, along with her pigtails, segued into more traditional teenaged styles, and her declaration of, and reliance on, "Punky Power!" gave way to the realization that intelligence, common sense, and a strong will can get one out of any problem. More of her dalliances with boys entered the stories, with the ones she chased and those that tried to pursue her. Punky's spunk and vivacious attitude toward life did remain, though, thanks in part to the sunshine brought in by the most important man in her life, her adoptive dad.

Soleil Moon Frye as Punky Brewster

Henry's photography studio at the mall continued to see much success, so much that by the end of the third season, he received an offer from the magnate of Glossy's, a photo-studio franchise, for a $100,000 buyout of Warnimont's, which also included the offer of Henry becoming manager of the Glossy's location. Henry accepted, but soon found that his creativity and business style were not being appreciated by his new employers. He quit Glossy's, but then decided to give into Punky and Cherie's dream to run their own teen hangout/burger establishment, and invested into another mall property, which ended up being splashed with as much color and originality as Punky's bedroom. All involved, which even included Betty and Margaux, unanimously decided on christening it "Punky's Place". Into season four, much of the action continued to take place at the mall, with Henry, Punky, and her friends' efforts to keep their new restaurant afloat and the many teenage misadventures which passed through at Punky's Place.

From December 10, 1987 to April 26, 1988, reruns from the third season were added to the Punky Brewster syndication package. On April 27, 1988, new episodes resumed for the fourth season, and ran every weekday for a month until the series finale aired on May 27, 1988.

The final episode, "Wedding Bells for Brandon", features Brandon falling in love with Brenda, a golden retriever that belonged to one of Henry and Punky's neighbors. Their whirlwind romance culminated in a wedding ceremony in the courtyard, which was attended mostly by other neighborhood canines.

According to Cherie Johnson, "Wedding Bells for Brandon" was not intended to be the series finale; that particular episode came along in the midst of the 1988 Writers Guild of America strike.

=== Revival (2021) ===
In June 2019, UCP announced plans for a new Punky Brewster series starring Soleil Moon Frye. The series revisits Punky as a single mother of three "trying to get her life back on track when she meets a young girl who reminds her a lot of her younger self". The series also features Cherie Johnson, returning to the role named after her, as well as Freddie Prinze Jr. as Punky's ex-husband. In early 2020, NBC confirmed the revival consisting of a ten-episode first season that will air on its new streaming Peacock network. The revival premiered on February 25, 2021. In August 2021, the series was canceled after one season.

== Episodes ==
| Season | Episodes | Originally released | | |
| Season | Episodes | First released | Last released | Network |
|---|---|---|---|---|
| 1 | 20 | September 16, 1984 | March 31, 1985 | NBC |
| 2 | 22 | September 15, 1985 | March 9, 1986 | NBC |
| 3 | 22 | October 30, 1987 | December 7, 1987 | Syndication |
| 4 | 22 | April 27, 1988 | May 27, 1988 | Syndication |

== Cast ==
Clockwise from bottom-right: Frye, Sandy, Johnson, Garrett, Gaynes, Ellison and Foster (center)

=== Main ===
- George Gaynes as Henry Warnimont
- Soleil Moon Frye as Penelope "Punky" Brewster
- Susie Garrett as Betty Johnson
- Cherie Johnson as Cherie Johnson
- T. K. Carter as Michael 'Mike' Fulton (season 2)

=== Recurring ===
- Ami Foster as Margaux Kramer
- Casey Ellison as Allen Anderson (seasons 1–2, guest star season 3)
- Eddie Deezen as Eddie Malvin (season 1)
- Dody Goodman as Mrs. Morton (season 1)

== Production notes ==
The show was produced by Lightkeeper Productions, and NBC Productions during the network run. NBC was not allowed to co-produce the series when it moved into syndication, due to then-existing FCC regulations regarding network involvement in syndicated TV programming. Thus, they made a syndication deal with Coca-Cola Telecommunications to co-produce two more seasons of episodes, plus U.S. syndication rights to the NBC-era episodes. Thus, Sony Pictures Television holds the domestic television rights, while NBCUniversal Syndication Studios holds international television and worldwide home video & streaming rights. Additionally, MGM Television also holds international television broadcast rights with NBCUniversal, part of the pre-2004 NBC Studios library.

Reruns of the series were broadcast in the United States on The Family Channel from October 3, 1993, to September 20, 1996.

=== Theme song ===
The theme song for Punky Brewster is "Every Time I Turn Around," written by Gary Portnoy and Judy Hart Angelo and sung by Portnoy.

=== Origin of the name ===
NBC programming chief Brandon Tartikoff named the series after a girl he had a crush on in his own childhood: an older tomboy named Peyton "Punky" Brewster. Before the series aired, NBC tracked her down (by this time, she was married and named Peyton Rutledge) and secured her permission to use her name for the lead character. Rutledge was even hired to do a cameo in one episode as a teacher at Punky's school (in the opening scene of the episode titled "The Search", aired November 10, 1985) so that both the real and fictional Punky Brewster could be on-screen at the same time (the teacher even comments "Punky Brewster? Strange name!"). She is credited at the end of the episode as Peyton B. Rutledge.

Punky's dog is named Brandon, after Tartikoff himself. The dog's real name was Sandy. Sandy originally shared the role with his brother, but Tartikoff decided that Sandy was better for the role.

== Home media ==
All four seasons have been released on DVD in Region 1 by Shout! Factory, as well as separate discs that consist of six to eight episodes of the series. All season releases also contain episodes of the spin-off cartoon, It's Punky Brewster.

Mill Creek Entertainment also released three "Best-of" collections of the series.

| DVD Name | Ep# | Release dates | |
| DVD Name | Ep# | Region 1 | Region 4 |
|---|---|---|---|
| Season One | 22 | June 1, 2004 | April 13, 2011 |
| Season Two | 22 | February 8, 2005 | July 1, 2011 |
| Season Three | 22 | July 25, 2006 | N/A |
| Season Four | 22 | February 26, 2008 | N/A |

In Region 4, Umbrella Entertainment has released the first two seasons on DVD in Australia. These releases do not contain episodes of the animated It's Punky Brewster.

== Spin-offs ==
=== Fenster Hall ===
The final episode of Season 1, "Fenster Hall" (aired March 31, 1985), was a failed attempt to create a spin-off of Punky Brewster. It is a one-hour episode, but was cut into two shows for syndication. This crossover episode marked the debut of Mike Fulton; T. K. Carter was the intended star of the Fenster Hall spin-off. Mike's history as a longtime resident of Fenster was explained, since he had been an orphan from birth and had been shuffled around to many foster homes before permanently staying at Fenster from the time he was seven. Now as the chief boys' counselor, Mike was saddled with helping new, tough street kid T.C. Finestra (Billy Lombardo) fit in with his group of regular charges, after an incident in which T.C. broke into and stole from the bedroom of Punky Brewster. Punky had a confrontation with T.C. after following him to a shady lair kept by street thug Blade (James LeGros), who had taken T.C. under his wing and was teaching him how to rob. It was there in which Punky learned of T.C.'s situation, and brought him home to Henry before it was decided that he would be better off at Fenster.

The primary focus of the episode is on Mike and T.C. learning to trust and look out for each other, while many other denizens of Fenster are introduced who would have comprised the cast of the spin-off. Mike's boss is Rita J. Sanchez (Rosanna DeSoto), and his other boys, who he treats as if they are his own sons, are aspiring heavyweight boxer Lester "Sugar" Thompson (Martin Davis), sweet little Dash (Benji Gregory), nerdy intellectual Lyle (Gabriel Damon), who supposedly did Mike's tax forms for him; and huge, hulking Conan (B.J. Barie). When Fenster Hall did not transpire as a regular series by the time of NBC's 1985–86 upfronts, T.K. Carter then continued his role as Mike Fulton on Punky Brewster the following season, now serving as Punky's fourth grade teacher.

=== It's Punky Brewster ===
It's Punky Brewster!, an animated spin-off with the original cast, appeared on NBC on Saturday mornings. The cartoon was produced by Ruby-Spears. It ran from September 14, 1985, to December 6, 1986, for a total of 26 episodes. However, through reruns, it remained in the regular Saturday-morning lineup through the 1988–89 season. The series was later syndicated by Claster Television as part of a package featuring the DIC series Maxie's World (the "lead" program), and Beverly Hills Teens.

== See also ==
- List of animated spin-offs from prime time shows
- Little Orphan Annie, a comic strip series featuring a young girl with foster dad, and friends
