= Susie Garrett =

American actress and singer (1929–2002)

- Born: December 29, 1929; Detroit, Michigan, U.S.
- Died: May 24, 2002 (aged 72); Southfield, Michigan, U.S.
- Occupations: Actress, musician
- Years active: 1984–1989

Susie Garrett (December 29, 1929 – May 24, 2002) was an American actress of theatre and television, jazz vocalist and acting teacher. She is best known for playing Cherie's grandmother Betty Johnson on the NBC series Punky Brewster.

== Personal life ==
Garrett had an associate degree in psychology from Shaw College at Detroit. She was the mother of four sons, and the older sister of Marla Gibbs. Together, Garrett and Gibbs co-founded the Crossroads Art Academy acting school in Los Angeles.

== Career ==
Born in Detroit in 1929, she sang jazz at clubs in the city. She starred in such plays as Dark of the Moon and Shakin' the Mess Out of Misery, and had a small part in the 1989 film Wicked Stepmother.

Aside from Punky Brewster, she had guest starred on her sister's TV series The Jeffersons and 227.

== Death ==
In 2002, Garrett died of cancer at Providence Hospital in Southfield, Michigan, at the age of 72. She is interred at Woodlawn Cemetery, which incorrectly lists her birth year as 1931.

== Filmography ==
Year	Title	Role	Note(s)
1984-85	The Jeffersons	Amanda	2 episodes
1984-88	Punky Brewster	Betty Johnson	86 episodes
1989	227	Woman	Episode: "The Real Decoys"
1989	Wicked Stepmother	Mandy	
