= Wrinkles (radio series) =

BBC radio comedy series

Wrinkles is a radio comedy series produced and broadcast in the United Kingdom by BBC Radio 4 for two series of six episodes each in 1980 and 1981. It is notable as the first series written solely by the writing team of Rob Grant and Doug Naylor, who would go on to create the internationally successful television sitcom Red Dwarf.

Set in an old people's home, it starred Tom Mennard, Anthea Askey, Ballard Berkeley, David Ross, Gordon Salkilld and Nick Maloney. It was created and produced by Mike Craig.
