= Wrinkles (toy) =

1980s plush toy line

One of the Wrinkles, "Wrinkles Gemma White"

Wrinkles is a discontinued line of plush toys previously manufactured by Canadian toy company Ganz Bros released in Canada in 1985. The toys are identified by their characteristic wrinkled faces and clothing. They were based on the hound breed of dog. The original design was created by Senitt Puppets, based in Carnarvon, Ontario. Catherine Senitt designed and sold handmade puppets for over twenty years throughout the United States and Canada.

Trunkit, the Wrinkles elephant

The dogs were made in three sizes. Most common are the medium-sized toys, which are about 18 inches (46 cm) high, and are the most anthropomorphic, as they were designed to sit upright. They are dressed in jogging suits, in overalls and a T-shirt, or in dresses, and have openings to allow them to double as hand puppets. There are also smaller, nine-inch-high (23 cm) toys, who sit on four legs and wear bonnets and booties, and larger toys, which are over 2 feet (61 cm) tall. Other Wrinkles animals were also manufactured, including a moose named Moogums (or Moogy), and an elephant named Trunkit.

As proof of authenticity, all Wrinkles toys have a bone-shaped symbol embroidered into their ear. As well, they all came with a fabric bone. The plush Wrinkles spawned some additional merchandise, including metal dinner trays, PVC figures, poseable dolls and even a direct to video movie featuring child actress Ami Foster.

The Wrinkles TV advertisement which aired during the 1980s featured the Wrinkles talking and chatting to the camera and finished with the dog looking to the screen and exclaiming "Hi, I'm Wrinkles, I've got my name under my ear!", at which point it flicked its little plush head to one side, lifting its ear to reveal the bone-shaped symbol under the ear.

Wrinkles have been sold as part of Ganz's "Heritage Collection", though the line appears to have been discontinued. Wrinkles dogs are fairly common fare on eBay and other auction sites selling toys.
