= Cherie Johnson =

American actress, writer and film producer and author (born 1975)

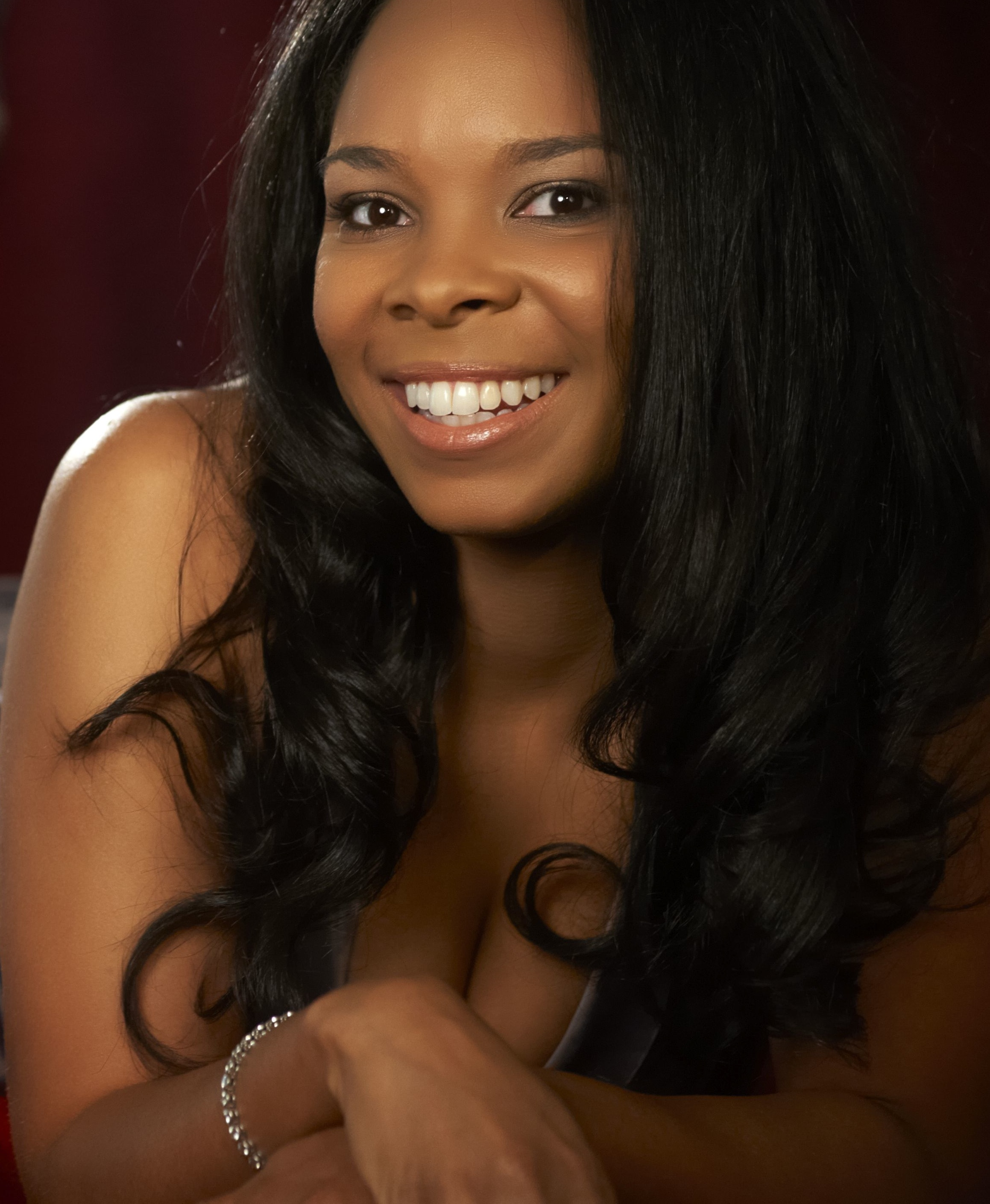
- Johnson in 2010
- Born: November 21, 1975 (age 50)
- Occupations: Actress; writer; film producer; author
- Years active: 1984–present
- Children: 1
- Relatives: David W. Duclon (uncle)

Cherie Johnson (born November 21, 1975) is an American actress, writer, film producer, and author. She is known for her roles on Punky Brewster as Punky's best friend Cherie and Family Matters, where she played Laura Winslow's best friend Maxine Johnson for eight seasons (1990–1998).

In 2009, she wrote, starred in, and produced the independent film I Do... I Did!, playing Vivian. Johnson has so far produced eight films. In 2010, she made writer debut when she released her book Around The World Twice. In 2011, she released her second, writing, Two Different Walks Of Life A Celebrity and Average Housewife. Her third novel Peaches and Cream is available. Her book Stupid Guys Diary was released in August 2013.

== Background and career ==
Johnson's beginnings in show business are attributed to her late maternal uncle, David W. Duclon, a successful screenwriter and TV producer, who was known for his work on Happy Days in the 1970s. Duclon encouraged his niece's desire to act, and secured her an audition. In 1984, after two seasons as executive producer of NBC's Silver Spoons (co-created by Howard Leeds), Duclon successfully pitched a new pilot to the network about an orphaned young girl who is taken in by a curmudgeonly older man. The concept won the approval of NBC programming chief Brandon Tartikoff, who named the titular character, and series, Punky Brewster (after a girl he had known in his youth). Johnson was cast by NBC in the role of Punky's (Soleil Moon Frye) best friend, the character modeled and named after herself. Punky Brewster was an immediate success among young audiences, and Johnson continued as the fictional Cherie throughout the series' run (1984–86 on NBC, and 1987–88 in first-run syndication).

In 1990, Johnson began playing Maxine "Max" Johnson, the best friend of Laura Winslow (Kellie Shanygne Williams) on ABC's Family Matters, appearing in the recurring role until the series' end in 1998. Duclon was again her employer, as he served as one of the executive producers of Family Matters during Johnson's run on the show. In addition to her starring roles, Johnson has made guest appearances on The Parkers and other different work. She has also appeared on Days of Our Lives. In the early 2000s, Johnson began producing films. In 2009, she wrote, starred in, and produced the film I Do... I Did!. In 2010, she starred in many films Lights Out, Nobody Smiling and Guardian of Eden. She then signed on to appear in the romantic film Fanaddict, which was shot in 2011 and is slated for release later in 2013.

In 2020, NBC confirmed a 10-episode revival of Punky Brewster on its Peacock streaming service. Soleil Moon Frye and Johnson reprised their roles.

=== Writer ===
Her first novel, Around The World Twice, was released August 10, 2010. On April 14, 2011, Johnson also released a poetry book with her I Do...I Did! co-writer, entitled Two Different Walks of Life. Her second novel was Peaches and Cream, and her book of diary entries Stupid Guys Diary was released August 2014 . Little Cherie Dresses Herself, a children's book wrote in two languages, was released 2016. Writing has become Johnson's second career choice; she is also the assistant editor of Fever magazine and was formerly the executive director for Dimez magazine, and was contributing writer for Temptation magazine and Glam Couture magazine, where she did a monthly article titled "Cherie Picking". In 2016, she accepted a position at Fever magazine.

== Personal life ==
Johnson joined Shadow Play Entertainment's literacy campaign, called "Take Time to Read", as the national spokesperson, sharing her thoughts on why reading is so important no matter what career people choose. She has stated that her favorite musical artists are Prince and Dr. Dre. Johnson has also explained that she is a big sports fanatic; her favorite team is the Pittsburgh Steelers, and she is a fan of former NBA player Paul Pierce. During an interview, Johnson described herself as somewhat of a nerd and a homebody and that she loves to read, write, paint, eat and travel. She also stated she doesn't watch any TV nor many movies, but she loves music and her family. She has also stated she is somewhat of a "Twitter-holic" and is often tweeting.

Johnson spends her free time working with many children's charities, and she is also on the Alzheimer's Association board.

== Filmography ==
=== Film ===
Year	Title	Role	Notes
1985	Playing with Fire	Eileen Phillips	TV movie
1985	Back to Next Saturday	Cherie Johnson	TV movie
1989	A Little Bit Strange	Tasha Masterson	TV movie
1999	Teaching Mrs. Tingle	Student	
2003	Malibooty	Lady-Mixed Tape Sign Up	Video
2007	Killer Weekend	Renee	Video
2007	Dead Tone	Roxy	
2009	I Do... I Did!	Vivian	
2010	Nobody Smiling	Jo	
2010	Raven	Starla	
2010	Lights Out	Detective Monroe	
2011	Fanaddict	Brenda	
2012	Guardian of Eden	Destiny	
2012	One Blood	Sandra	
2013	Plum	Scientist Tara	
2013	Crush	Emma	Video
2014	Behind De Pole	Michelle	
2014	Who Can I Run To	Trisha	
2014	Signed, Sealed & Delivered	Keisha	
2015	Diamond Cobra vs The White Fox	Darla Jones	TV movie
2016	Diva Diaries	Tonya	
2017	The Perfect Wife	-	
2017	The Intruders	Bernadette	
2020	Saturday School	Ms. Michaels	

=== Television ===
Year	Title	Role	Notes
1984–1988	Punky Brewster	Cherie Johnson	Main cast
1985	Days of Our Lives	Latoya Preston	Regular Cast
1985	It's Punky Brewster	Cherie Johnson (voice)	Recurring cast: season 1
1990–1998	Family Matters	Maxine Johnson	Recurring cast
1993	ABC TGIF	Maxine Johnson	Episode: "Episode dated 8 October 1993"
1996	Goode Behavior	Angie Kimberly	Episode: "Goode and Fired"
1999–2002	The Parkers	Tiffany	Recurring cast: season 1, guest: season 3
2005	Eve	Angela	Episode: "If the Shrew Fits"
2011	The Bay	Carlina Hall	Episode: "Far from the Bay Part 8"
2013	The Therapist	Kristy	Episode: "It's Never Work"
2019	A Place Called Hollywood	Rosie	Main cast
2021	Punky Brewster	Cherie Johnson	Main cast

== Writings ==
- 2010: Around the World Twice
- 2011: Two Different Walks of Life: "A Celebrity and Average Housewife"
- 2012: August 7 novel Peaches & Cream
- 2013: "Stupid Guys Diary"
- 2018: "Lil Cherie Dresse's Herself"

== Awards and nominations ==
Year	Association	Category	Title of work	Result
1985	Young Artist Awards	Best Young Supporting Actress in a Television Series	Punky Brewster	Nominated
1986	Young Artist Awards	Exceptional Performance by a Young Actress in a Long Running Series: Comedy or Drama	Punky Brewster	Nominated
1987	Young Artist Awards	Outstanding Young Actor/Actress/Ensemble in Animation Voice-Over	It's Punky Brewster	Nominated
1993	Young Artist Awards	Best Young Actress Recurring in a Television Series	Family Matters	Nominated
