= Noah Cottrell =

American actor

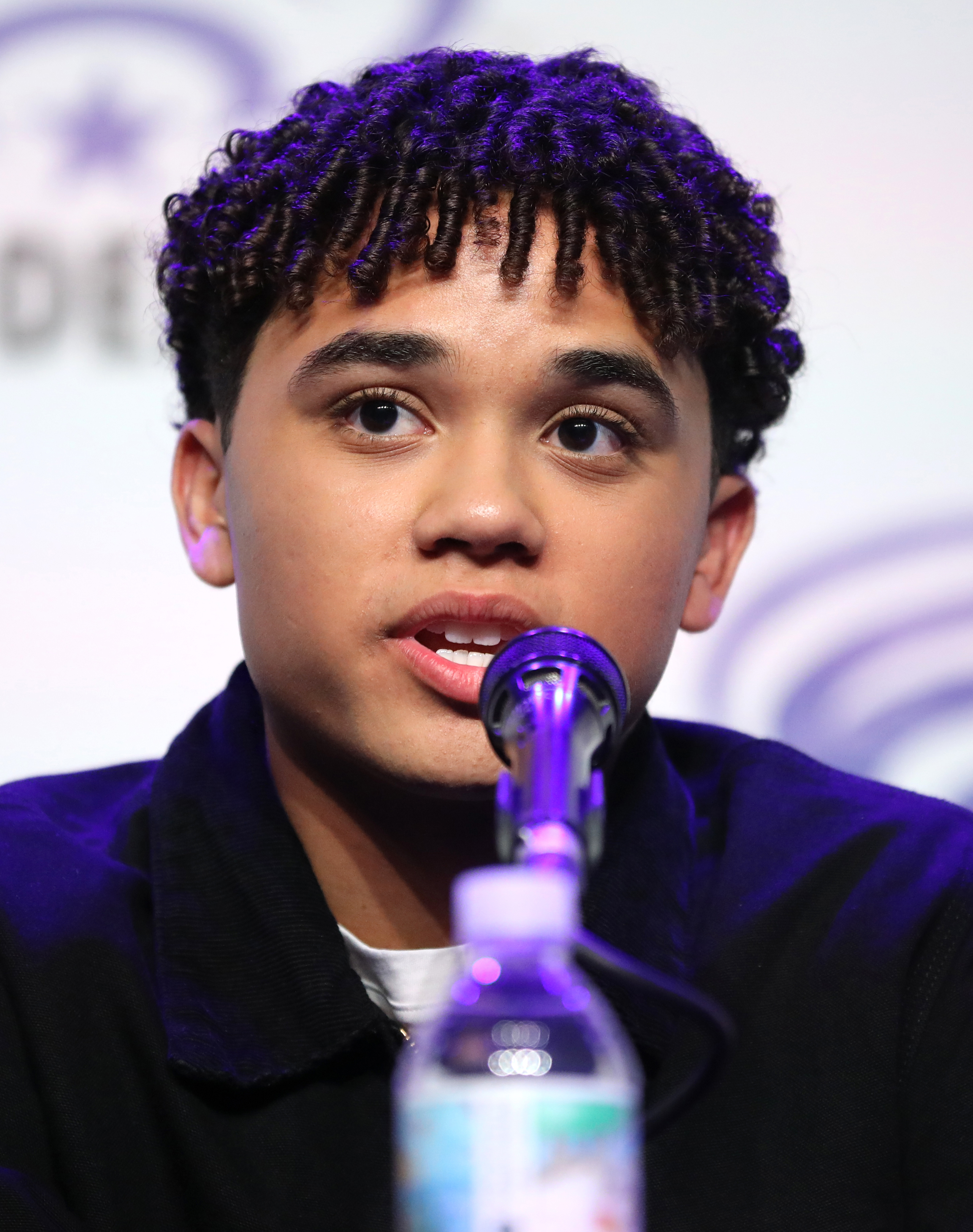
- Cottrell in 2024
- Born: Noah Aidan Cottrell; Fort Worth, Texas, U.S.
- Occupation: Actor
- Years active: 2013–present

Noah Aidan Cottrell is an American actor. He is best known for making his breakthrough role as Henry Sawyer in the action film Skyscraper (2018). In television, he has played Diego in the 2021 reboot sitcom Punky Brewster (2021), and Simon Grace in the fantasy television series The Spiderwick Chronicles (2024).

== Early life ==
Noah Aidan Cottrell was born in Fort Worth, Texas, the youngest of three children and the son of Joseph Comer and Michelle Ann (née Salinas) Cottrell.

== Career ==
When he was 6, Cottrell took acting classes and started commercial and modelling work in order to follow in his siblings' footsteps. In 2018, Cottrell made his breakthrough role as Henry Sawyer in the 2018 action film Skyscraper, starring Dwayne Johnson, Neve Campbell, Chin Han, Roland Møller and Pablo Schreiber.

In 2022, he was cast as Simon Grace in the 2024 television adaptation of the book series The Spiderwick Chronicles.

== Filmography ==
=== Film ===
Year	Title	Role	Notes
2018	Skyscraper	Henry Sawyer	
2024	Monster Summer	Ben Driskel	

=== Television ===
Year	Title	Role	Notes
2021	Punky Brewster	Diego	Main cast
2022	Gordita Chronicles	Rigo	4 episodes
2023	Saturdays	Ivan	5 episodes
2023	Young Love	Additional Voice (voice)	5 episodes
2024–present	The Spiderwick Chronicles	Simon Grace	Main cast
