= Punky Brewster (2021 TV series) =

American television sitcom

- Genre: Sitcom
- Created by: David W. Duclon
- Developed by: Steve Armogida & Jim Armogida
- Starring: Soleil Moon Frye; Cherie Johnson; Quinn Copeland; Noah Cottrell; Oliver De Los Santos; Lauren Lindsey Donzis; Freddie Prinze Jr.
- Composer: Linda Perry
- Country of origin: United States
- Original language: English
- No. of seasons: 1
- No. of episodes: 10

Production
- Executive producers: Steve Armogida & Jim Armogida; Jimmy Fox; David W. Duclon; Soleil Moon Frye; Jonathan Judge
- Producers: Chris R. Robinson; Jordan Black; Mary Kay Kelly; Kira Kalush
- Cinematography: Joe Pennella
- Editor: Timothy Ryder
- Camera setup: Multi-camera
- Running time: 23–28 minutes
- Production companies: Armogida Brothers Productions; Main Event Media; Universal Television; Universal Content Productions

Original release
- Network: Peacock
- Release: February 25, 2021

Punky Brewster is an American television sitcom that premiered on Peacock on February 25, 2021. Developed by Steve Armogida and Jim Armogida, it is a legacy sequel to the show of the same title created by David W. Duclon (who returned to serve as an executive producer) and stars Soleil Moon Frye and Cherie Johnson, with Quinn Copeland, Noah Cottrell, Oliver De Los Santos, Lauren Lindsey Donzis and Freddie Prinze Jr. In August 2021, the series was canceled after one season.

== Premise ==
Punky Brewster is now a divorced mother raising three children: her teenage biological daughter Hannah, and her two adopted sons, Diego and Daniel. She lives in the same Chicago apartment where she grew up with her foster (later adoptive) father, Henry Warnimont, and even works as a photographer, just like he did. She encounters a girl at Fenster Hall named Izzy, who, like Punky, was abandoned by her mother. Punky is still best friends with Cherie, who works at Fenster and arranges to have Izzy live with a foster family, but after seeing the similarities in Izzy compared to when she was her age, Punky decides to take her in and raise her with her three children. Punky also has an on-off relationship with her ex-husband Travis and discovers that the mother who abandoned her in the grocery store as a child is still alive and has been looking for her for years.

== Cast ==
=== Main ===
- Soleil Moon Frye as Penelope "Punky" Brewster
- Cherie Johnson as Cherie Johnson
- Quinn Copeland as Izzy
- Noah Cottrell as Diego
- Oliver De Los Santos as Daniel
- Lauren Lindsey Donzis as Hannah
- Freddie Prinze Jr. as Travis

=== Guest stars ===
- Seth Green as Evan (episode: "Two First Dates")
- Ami Foster as Margaux Kramer (episode: "The Look of Daniel")
- Alexa Bliss and Charlotte Flair as themselves (episode: "The Look of Daniel")
- Sharon Lawrence as Susan (3 episodes)

== Production ==
A Punky Brewster revival series was reported to be in development in June 2019. In September of that year, it was reported the series, along with the Saved by the Bell revival, would appear on the Peacock streaming service. A 10-episode first season was greenlit by Peacock in January 2020. On August 19, 2021, Peacock canceled the series after one season.

It would be the last series David W. Duclon was involved in, before his death on January 15, 2025.

== Episodes ==
| No. | Title | Directed by | Written by | Original release date |
|---|---|---|---|---|
| 1 | "Pilot" | Jonathan Judge | Teleplay by : Steve Armogida & Jim Armogida; Story by : Steve Armogida & Jim Armogida and David W. Duclon & Jimmy Fox | February 25, 2021 |
Punky is now a divorced mother of three, still living in her childhood apartment. She meets Izzy, a 7-year-old abandoned by her mother, just as Punky had been abandoned. She decides to become Izzy's foster mother.
| 2 | "Making Room for Izzy" | Jonathan Judge | Sarah Jane Cunningham & Suzie V. Freeman | February 25, 2021 |
Punky needs to figure out where Izzy will sleep in the crowded apartment. She receives a phone call from her long-absent mother, and is unsure if she wants to meet with her.
| 3 | "Two First Dates" | Jonathan Judge | Robin Shorr | February 25, 2021 |
Punky goes on her first post-divorce date on the same day Hannah has a first date. Travis is suffering from writer's block, and Izzy helps him write a song.
| 4 | "Under the Influence" | Jody Margolin Hahn | Jay Kogen | February 25, 2021 |
When Punky finds a joint in Hannah's room she and former husband Travis discuss whether Hannah's boyfriend is a bad influence. Izzy tries to behave perfectly to make sure she won't be returned to Fenster Hall.
| 5 | "Looking for Love and a Hat" | Jody Margolin Hahn | Jordan Black | February 25, 2021 |
Punky dates a rock musician, upsetting Travis. Izzy loses her favorite cap, and the family helps her find it. Cherie has a yard sale for Fenster Hall and Punky helps out, trying to convince customers to pay more for what they want to buy.
| 6 | "The Look of Daniel" | Jude Weng | Jim Armogida & Steve Armogida | February 25, 2021 |
When Daniel wears a sarong to school Punky and Travis wonder about their son's gender identity. Izzy becomes obsessed with WWE and Punky takes her to a wrestling match.
| 7 | "The Treehouse That Punky Built" | Phill Lewis | Kira Kalush | February 25, 2021 |
Punky and Cherie fix up their old treehouse since it is too dangerous for Izzy to play in. Hannah and her friends make an honesty pact, but discover complete honesty isn't always kind.
| 8 | "Put a Ring on It" | Kelly Park | Sarah Jane Cunningham & Suzie V. Freeman | February 25, 2021 |
Cherie is considering proposing to Lauren, and that causes Punky and Travis to remember the strong romantic feelings they used to share. Diego develops a crush on one of Hannah's friend.
| 9 | "'80s Block Party" | Kelly Park | Clay Lapari | February 25, 2021 |
Punky enjoys planning a 1980s-themed block party for the neighborhood, but she is ill-prepared when her long-absent mother shows up.
| 10 | "Mother's Day" | Katy Garretson | Steve Armogida & Jim Armogida | February 25, 2021 |
A foster hearing to decide Izzy's future causes Punky to confront her own past. She chooses to reconnect with her mother, and encourages Travis to follow his dream and go on a tour with his band.

== Reception ==
Review aggregator Rotten Tomatoes reported an approval rating of 57% based on 14 reviews, with an average rating of 5.90/10. The website's critical consensus reads, "It's delightful to see Soleil Moon Frye again, but with dated plotting and a lack of focus, Punky Brewster can't quite fill her multicolored Cons."
