= David W. Duclon =

American television writer (1950–2025)

- Born: Warren David Duclon; April 27, 1950; Rockford, Illinois, U.S.
- Died: January 15, 2025 (aged 74); Franklin, Tennessee, U.S.
- Occupations: Television writer and producer
- Notable work: Punky Brewster; Silver Spoons; Family Matters

Warren David Duclon (April 27, 1950 – January 15, 2025) was an American television writer and producer, known for his work on Silver Spoons, Family Matters, Punky Brewster and the legacy sequel of the same name. Duclon was born in Rockford, Illinois, on April 27, 1950. He died in Franklin, Tennessee, on January 15, 2025, at the age of 74.
