= 2 Hip 4 TV =

- Genre: Comedy
- Starring: Colin Quinn; Ahmet Zappa
- Country of origin: United States
- Original language: English

Production
- Running time: 60 minutes

Original release
- Release: September 10 – October 22, 1988

2 Hip 4 TV (stylized as 2HIP4TV) is an American variety show aimed at children that appeared on NBC in 1988 and was hosted by Colin Quinn and Ahmet Zappa. Musical guests included the Red Hot Chili Peppers, Edie Brickell and New Bohemians, Sparks and El Vez ("the Mexican Elvis"). The series was set in a bowling alley. It played on Saturday mornings.
