= Ed Gilbert =

American actor (1931–1999)

- Born: Edmund Francis Giesbert; June 29, 1931; Chicago, Illinois, U.S.
- Died: May 8, 1999 (aged 67); Beverly Hills, California, U.S.
- Occupation: Actor
- Years active: 1963–1999
- Known for: Baloo in TaleSpin
- Spouse: Virginia Smith (m. 1961)
- Children: 1

Ed Gilbert (born Edmund Francis Giesbert, June 29, 1931 – May 8, 1999) was an American actor, with extensive credits in both live-action roles and voice work in animation, but was better known for the latter. He is also credited, under his birth name, with research in entomology and the discovery of new beetle species.

== Early life and education ==
Gilbert graduated from the University of Chicago and fought in the Korean War.

== Career ==
During the 1960s, Gilbert appeared on television series such as The Gallant Men, Combat!, The Rogues, and Mannix. In 1966, he guest starred as Robert Cramer on four episodes of Ben Casey. He is known for his role as Fenton Hardy on the 1970s television series The Hardy Boys/Nancy Drew Mysteries.

Gilbert provided the voices of Superion, Thrust and Blitzwing in the second and third seasons of The Transformers, Kissyfur's father Gus in Kissyfur, Thirty-Thirty in BraveStarr, Baloo in the Disney animated series TaleSpin and again briefly as his adult self in Jungle Cubs, General Hawk in G.I. Joe: A Real American Hero, Puggsy and Daddy Starling in Tom and Jerry: The Movie, Mr. Smee in Peter Pan and the Pirates, Phasir in Aladdin, Mandarin in the first season of Iron Man, and Dormammu in Spider-Man. He voiced minor characters in Batman: The Animated Series, Batman: Mask of the Phantasm, Batman & Mr. Freeze: SubZero, and The New Batman Adventures. He also voiced the security guard Daryl in the computer game, Leisure Suit Larry 6: Shape Up or Slip Out!.

== Entomology ==
Gilbert, under his birth name Edmund Giesbert, also pursued the study of Coleoptera and described numerous beetle species and genera, particularly in the family Cerambycidae. At least four beetle genera are named in his honor (Giesberteclipta, Giesbertella, Giesbertia, and Giesbertiolus), and species such as Plectromerus giesberti.

== Death ==
Gilbert died on May 8, 1999, of lung cancer in his home in Beverly Hills, California, at the age of 67. He was survived by his wife Virginia and his daughter Dorian. His interment was at Eternal Valley Memorial Park and Mortuary in Newhall, California.

== Filmography ==
=== Film ===
Year	Title	Role	Notes
1964	36 Hours	Captain Abbott	
1971	Johnny Got His Gun	Priest	
1973	Howzer	Edward Carsell	
1986	The Transformers: The Movie	Blitzwing (voice)	
1986	Inhumanoids: The Evil That Lies Within	Metlar, Senator Masterson (voice)	
1987	G.I. Joe: The Movie	General Hawk (voice)	
1988	BraveStarr: The Movie	Thirty-Thirty, Shaman (voice)	
1988	Scooby-Doo! and the Reluctant Werewolf	Dr. Jekyll / Mr. Hyde (voice)	Direct-to-video
1989	Asterix and the Big Fight	Bossa Nova, Fishstix (voice)	English dub
1990	The Rescuers Down Under	Francois (voice)	
1992	Tom and Jerry: The Movie	Puggsy, Daddy Starling (voice)	
1994	The Pagemaster	George Merry (voice)	
1996	Father Frost	Robber Leader	
1998	Scooby-Doo on Zombie Island	Mr. Beeman (voice)	Direct-to-video

=== Television ===
Year	Title	Role	Notes
1973–1976	Police Story	Various roles	4 episodes
1976	Wonder Woman	Warden	Episode: "Wonder Woman Meets Baroness von Gunther"
1977	The Hardy Boys/Nancy Drew Mysteries	Fenton Hardy	28 episodes
1984–1987	The Transformers	Blitzwing, Thrust, Superion (voice)	27 episodes
1985–1986	G.I. Joe: A Real American Hero	General Hawk (voice)	19 episodes
1986-1988	Kissyfur	Gus (voice)	26 Episodes
1986	Inhumanoids	Metlar, Senator Masterson (voice)	13 episodes
1989	TUGS	Warrior, Big Mac, Zorran (voice)	Test US dub
1990–1991	TaleSpin	Baloo (voice)	Main role
1990–1991	Fox's Peter Pan & the Pirates	Mr. Smee (voice)	
1990–1993	The Adventures of Don Coyote and Sancho Panda	Additional voices	33 episodes
1993	Batman: The Animated Series	Jack Haly (voice)	Episode: "Robin's Reckoning"
1993–1994	SWAT Kats: The Radical Squadron	Katscracth Gang Member, Enforcer Sargent, Enforcer Commando, Tiger Conklin (voice)	4 episodes
1993–1996	Captain Planet and the Planeteers	Looten Plunder, Pillage (voice)	12 episodes
1994	Animaniacs	Neptune (voice)	Episode: "Mermaid Mindy"
1994	Iron Man	Mandarin, Grey Gargoyle, Ultimo, Al Gore (voice)	13 episodes
1994–1995	Tattooed Teenage Alien Fighters from Beverly Hills	Emperor Gorganus (voice)	40 episodes
1994–1995	Aaahh!!! Real Monsters	Icki's Locker, Macho, Colombus (voice)	2 episodes
1994–1996	Gargoyles	Bodhe, Captain of the Guard (voice)	7 episodes
1994–1996	The Tick	El Seed (voice)	3 episodes
1995	The New Adventures of Peter Rabbit	Tommy Brock (voice)	
1995	Black Scorpion	Breathtaker (voice)	Television film
1995–1996	Freakazoid!	Professor Heiney, Unag (voice)	3 episodes
1996	The Real Adventures of Jonny Quest	Various voices	4 episodes
1996	Dumb and Dumber	Bender, Clem (voice)	Episode: "Brain, Brain, Go Away"
1996	Dexter's Laboratory	Hunter, Space Hick (voice)	Episode: "Dial M for Monkey: Huntor"
1996	Road Rovers	Judge Fore (voice)	Episode: "The Dog Who Knew Too Much"
1996–1997	Spider-Man: The Animated Series	Dormammu, Phillip Watson (voice)	3 episodes
1997	Superman: The Animated Series	University Guard (voice)	Episode: "The Hand of Fate"
1997	The New Batman Adventures	Photographer (voice)	Episode: "Chemistry"
1997–1998	The New Adventures of Zorro	Additional voices	26 episodes
1998	I Am Weasel	Announcer, Man #2, Man #8	Episode: "I.R. Role Model"
1999	The Sylvester & Tweety Mysteries	Colonel Ambore (voice)	Episode: "Son of Roswell That Ends Well" (Final role)

=== Video games ===
Year	Title	Role	Notes
1993	Leisure Suit Larry 6: Shape Up or Slip Out!	Art, Daryl	
1995	Wanna Be a Dino Finder	Rock Hound	
1995	Shannara	Balinor	
