= Betty Thomas =

American director and actress (born 1947)

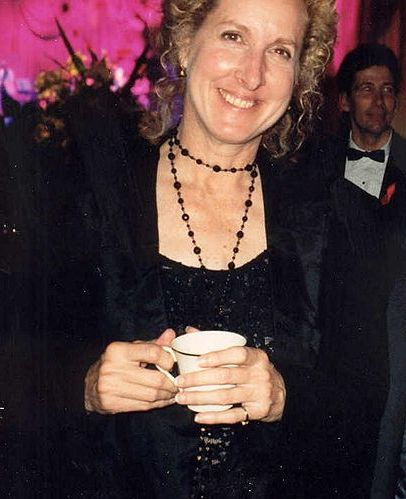
- Thomas at the Emmy Awards Governors Ball in 1994
- Born: Betty Lucille Nienhauser; July 27, 1947 (age 79); St. Louis, Missouri, U.S.
- Occupations: Actress, director
- Years active: 1975–present
- Spouse: Douglas Thomas

Betty Thomas (born Betty Lucille Nienhauser; July 27, 1947) is an American director and actress. She is known for her role as Sergeant Lucy Bates on the television series Hill Street Blues, a role for which she was nominated for an Emmy award seven times, winning once. Her latest film (released in 2009), Alvin and the Chipmunks: The Squeakquel, was at the time the highest-grossing film ever directed by a solo woman director (although it has since been surpassed.)

== Early life ==
Thomas was born Betty Lucille Nienhauser in St. Louis, Missouri, in 1947 to Nancy (née Brown) and William H. Nienhauser Sr. She graduated from Willoughby South High School, Willoughby, Ohio, in 1965. After high school Thomas attended Ohio University in Athens, Ohio, and graduated with a Bachelor of Fine Arts degree. Upon graduating Thomas worked as an artist and taught high school before becoming a part of The Second City, the premiere venue for improvisational theater in Chicago.

=== Second City ===
Thomas came to her entertainment career by a circuitous route. While working as an artist and school teacher, she became a waitress at The Second City to earn extra cash for a trip abroad. While waiting on tables, Thomas was encouraged to try out for the troupe, and subsequently joined the company.

She was praised for her brassy and outspoken performances, and became the first woman to direct one of their MainStage theatre productions. Thomas also worked with several up and coming Second City alumni, most notably Bill Murray. When The Second City opened a Los Angeles branch, Thomas moved west. She later reunited with some of the Second City cast members when she appeared as special guest star in a 1983 episode of SCTV.

== Career ==
=== Acting career ===
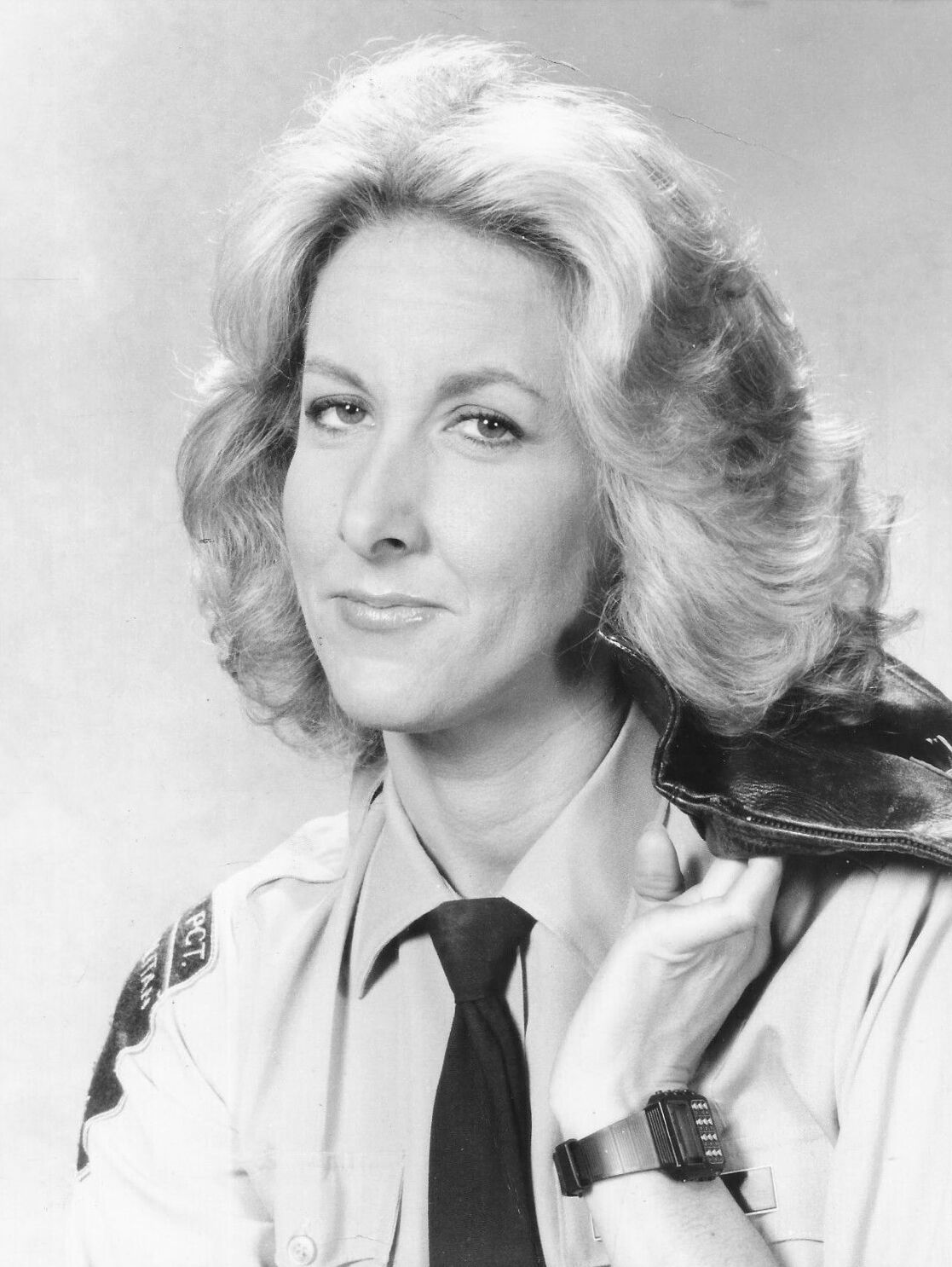
Thomas as Lucy Bates in Hill Street Blues, 1982

Upon her arrival in Los Angeles, Thomas received many bit parts in low-budget films like Chesty Anderson, USN (1976), the Robert Zemeckis film Used Cars (1980) as well as sketch comedy films like Tunnel Vision (1975), and Loose Shoes (1980), the latter of which featured Second City classmate Bill Murray.

While Thomas had been building her career in comedy, her breakthrough role as an actress came when she was cast in the role of police officer (later Sergeant) Lucy Bates on the TV series Hill Street Blues (1981–87). Over the course of the series her character goes from inexperienced rookie to confident sergeant. She received seven Emmy nominations for best supporting actress, and took home the award for the 1984–85 season.

=== Directing career ===
After having lied to a Variety reporter about planning on directing a Hooperman episode, she was given a real opportunity by the show's executive producer, and from there her directing career began. After making several other acting appearances, Thomas began directing episodes of Hooperman in addition to the premiere episodes of Doogie Howser, M.D. in 1989. She went on to direct episodes of Arresting Behavior and several episodes of the HBO series Dream On, the latter of which earned her an Emmy for best director. Thomas is nicknamed "The Midnight Queen" because of her preference for nighttime shoots.

In 1992, Thomas took the next step in her directing career with her feature debut Only You. A slight, playful romantic comedy, Only You was a departure from Thomas's experience on Hill Street Blues or her subsequent television directing. Wayne Rice, the film's producer and screenwriter, said that Thomas was chosen to direct due in part to the film's plot in which a man is on a hapless quest to find the perfect woman. He felt it would be considered inherently sexist without a female director.

Three years following the release of Only You, Thomas reunited with her Troop Beverly Hills costar Shelley Long when she directed The Brady Bunch Movie (1995), a postmodern satirical vision of the 1970s television series The Brady Bunch. The Brady Bunch Movie was a box office hit with domestic ticket sales of $46,576,136, nearly quadrupling its $12 million budget and making it at the time one of the highest-grossing films directed by a woman.

She followed The Brady Bunch Movie with other successes, including Private Parts (1997), Dr. Dolittle (1998), 28 Days (2000), and John Tucker Must Die (2006). In 2009 Alvin and the Chipmunks: The Squeakquel became the first female-directed picture to gross more than $200 million and made her the most successful woman director up to that time at the box office. In 2012, Thomas directed a low-budget online series called Audrey for the WIGS YouTube channel. In 1998, her Tall Trees productions company was signed to a first look deal with Columbia Pictures.

In 2001, Thomas won the Dorothy Arzner Directors Award of the Women in Film Crystal + Lucy Awards, presented by the Los Angeles chapter of the Women in Film Organization..

In 2021, Thomas received the Directors Guild of America Robert B. Aldrich Award.

== Filmography ==
=== Film ===
Year	Title	Role	Notes
1992	Only You	Director	
1995	The Brady Bunch Movie	Director	
1997	Private Parts	Director	
1998	Dr. Dolittle	Director	
1998	Can't Hardly Wait	Producer	
2000	28 Days	Director	
2000	Charlie's Angels	Executive Producer	
2001	Silicon Follies	Executive Producer	TV movie
2002	I Spy	Producer, Director	
2004	Surviving Christmas	Producer	
2005	Guess Who	Executive Producer	
2006	John Tucker Must Die	Director	
2009	Alvin and the Chipmunks: The Squeakquel	Director	

=== Television ===
TV series

Year	Title	Notes
1989	Hooperman	Episodes: "Goodnight, Sweet Hooperman", "Dog Day Afternoon", "Morning and Night", "In the Still of My Pants"
1989	Doogie Howser, M.D.	Episodes: "Doogie The Red-Nosed Reindeer", "The Ice Queen Cometh"
1990	Mancuso, FBI	Episodes: "Night of the Living Shred", "Shiva Me Timbers", "Murder of Pearl"
1990	Parenthood	Episodes: "Thanksgiving with a T that Rhymes with B that Stands for Basketball", "I Never Invested for My Father"
1990–1996	Dream On	18 episodes Primetime Emmy Award for Outstanding Directing for a Comedy Series (1993)
1991	Sons and Daughters	Episode: "The Thing"
1991	Midnight Caller	Episode: "Her Dirty Little Secret"
1991	Shannon's Deal	Episode: "Matrimony"
1992	On the Air	Episode #1.6
2006	The Loop	Pilot episode
2015	Grace and Frankie	Episode: "The Fall"

TV movies

Year	Title	Notes
2007	Dash 4 Cash	
2006	That Guy	
2003	Senor White	
2001	Silicon Follies	
1996	The Late Shift	Directors Guild of America Award for Outstanding Directorial Achievement in Dramatic Specials
1994	Couples	
1994	My Breast	

=== Acting roles ===
Year	Title	Role	Notes
1976	Tunnel Vision	Bridgit Bert Richards	
1976	Jackson County Jail	Waitress	
1976	The Last Affair		
1976	Chesty Anderson U.S. Navy	Party Guest #1	
1977	Dog and Cat	Waitress	
1978	C.P.O. Sharkey	Seaman Daley	
1978	Outside Chance	Katherine	
1980	Used Cars	Bunny	
1980	Loose Shoes	Biker Chic #1	
1981	The Nashville Grab	Maxine Pearce	
1982	Twilight Theater		
1982	Homework	Reddogs Secretary	
1983	When Your Lover Leaves	Maude	
1985	ABC Afterschool Specials	Dr. Mary Lewis	
1987	Prison for Children	Angela Brannon	
1981–1987	Hill Street Blues	Sgt. Lucy Bates	
1989	The Tracey Ullman Show	Miss Belts, Gym Teacher	Segment titled "Francesca: A Physical Education"
1989	Troop Beverly Hills	Velda Plendor	
2018	Kidding	Herself	Episode: "Green Means Go"
