= The Errand Boy =

1961 film by Jerry Lewis

- Theatrical release poster
- Directed by: Jerry Lewis
- Written by: Jerry Lewis; Bill Richmond
- Produced by: Ernest D. Gluscksman
- Starring: Jerry Lewis; Brian Donlevy; Howard McNear; Dick Wesson
- Cinematography: W. Wallace Kelley
- Edited by: Stanley E. Johnson
- Music by: Walter Scharf
- Production company: Paramount Pictures
- Distributed by: Paramount Pictures
- Release date: November 28, 1961 (U.S.)
- Running time: 92 minutes
- Country: United States
- Language: English
- Box office: $3 million (U.S./Canada rentals); 843,546 admissions (France)

The Errand Boy is a 1961 American comedy film directed by, co-written by, and starring Jerry Lewis.

== Plot ==
Paramutual Pictures decide that they need a spy to find out the inner workings of their studio. Morty S. Tashman, (the initial 'S' stands for 'scared'), is a paperhanger who happens to be working right outside their window. They decide that he is the man for the job and hire him on the spot. He bumbles his way through a series of misadventures, reporting everything back to the corporate executives.

The Paramutual Studio president eventually has to fire Morty for incompetency. But secret film taken of his bumbling becomes public and everybody wants to know who the terrific new comedy star is. Paramutual is forced to beg Morty to come back and rescue the studio from bankruptcy, which he does.

== Cast ==
- Jerry Lewis as Morty S. Tashman
- Brian Donlevy as Tom "T. P." Paramutual
- Howard McNear as Dexter Sneak
- Dick Wesson as the A. D.
- Robert Ivers as young New York director who argues with T. P.
- Pat Dahl as Miss Carson
- Renée Taylor as Miss Giles
- Rita Hayes as singer who dubs Davitt
- Stanley Adams as Grumpy
- Kathleen Freeman as Mrs. Helen Paramutual / Mrs. T. P.
- Isobel Elsom as Irma Paramutual
- Sig Ruman as Baron Elston Carteblanche
- Felicia Atkins as Serina
- Doodles Weaver as Weaver
- Fritz Feld as Roaring '20s director
- Richard Bakalyan as studio director
- Kenneth MacDonald as Mr. Fumble
- Herb Vigran as man with cigar in elevator
- Barry Livingston as boy who wants jelly beans
- Milton Frome as Mr. Greenback
- Benny Rubin as Mr. Wabenlotnee
- Paul Frees as narrator (uncredited)

=== Cast notes ===
- The cast of the western TV series Bonanza makes a cameo appearance.
- Leo Durocher (baseball manager and player) gives a group of "studio kids" (actually the Dover Basketeers) a pep talk.
- Joe Besser, a former member of the Three Stooges, has a bit part.

== Production ==
The Errand Boy was filmed from July 24 to September 1, 1961, and was released on November 28, 1961, by Paramount Pictures.

== Release ==
In 1967, it was re-released on a double bill with another Jerry Lewis film, Cinderfella.

== Reception ==
On Rotten Tomatoes, the film holds a 50% rating based on 10 reviews, with an average rating of 5.47/10.

The film earned theatrical rentals of $3 million in the United States and Canada.

== Home media ==
The film was released on DVD on October 12, 2004, July 15, 2014, in a 4-film collection, 4 Film Favorites: Jerry Lewis, with The Bellboy, The Ladies Man, and The Patsy, and March 15, 2021.

== Remake ==
In June 1997, it was reported that following the success of the 1996 remake of The Nutty Professor, Jerry Lewis had sold the remake rights to The Errand Boy to Hollywood Pictures.
