= Britt Leach =

American actor (born 1938)

- Leach in 1976
- Born: July 18, 1938 (age 88); Gadsden, Alabama, U.S.
- Occupation: Actor
- Years active: 1971–1991

Britt Leach (born July 18, 1938) is an American actor. He was in "A Single Drop of Rain", the season 4 episode of Quantum Leap.

== Biography and acting career ==
Leach was born on July 18, 1938, in Gadsden, Alabama. He graduated from McCallie School, a boy's college-preparatory school in Chattanooga, Tennessee, in 1956. He graduated from Birmingham–Southern College, where he was active in college theater, in the mid-1960s. He attended Northwestern University and briefly worked in Army intelligence.

Leach's film and television career started in the early 1970s. His most memorable movie roles include boorish hick bartender Dan Oldum in Jackson County Jail, hard-nosed detective Sergeant Cook in Night Warning, cranky toy store manager Mr. Sims in Silent Night, Deadly Night, trailer park resident Mr. Potter in The Last Starfighter, Anthony Michael Hall's plumber father in Weird Science and redneck hunter Reg in The Great Outdoors.

During the fall of 1976, Leach was cast in the role of Mickey "Wig" Wiggins, an airplane mechanic, in the eleven-episode CBS adventure series Spencer's Pilots, starring Gene Evans, Christopher Stone and Todd Susman. Among the many television shows on which he has appeared are The Brady Bunch, The Partridge Family, Insight, Bonanza, Hawkins, Three's Company, Tales from the Crypt, and Newhart. He is probably most recognized for his reoccurring role as Easy Jackson on The Waltons.

Leach left acting in the early 1990s. His final film role was an uncredited appearance in the 1991 film Father of the Bride, in which his character, a supermarket assistant manager, confronts Steve Martin's character for making a scene in the supermarket and has him imprisoned for it.

From 1992 to 1999, Leach was co-editor and publisher of Country Connections, an award-winning bi-monthly magazine which covered environmental and progressive social issues. He has also written poems.

In 2007, Leach did not renew his membership in the Academy of Motion Picture Arts and Sciences and wrote of his frustration with DVD screeners in a satirical piece on his website.

Leach resides in Sherman Oaks, California, with his wife, Catherine Roberts Leach.

== Filmography ==
Year	Title	Role	Notes
1971	The Brady Bunch	Davy Jones' Manager	
1971, 1973	The Odd Couple	Morris / Hobart	Episodes: "Oscar's New Life", "That Is the Army, Mrs. Madison"
1972	Fuzz	Detective #1	
1972	Bonanza	Postal Clerk	Episode: "The Twenty Sixth Grave"
1973	Interval	Leonard	
1973	Hawkins	Technician	Episode: "A Life for a Life"
1974	The California Kid	Johnny	TV movie
1974	Happy Days	Reverend Harlan	Episode: "A Star is Bored"
1975	Sanford and Son	Leonard Johnson	Episode: "Earthquake II"
1976	Jackson County Jail	Dan Oldum (Bartender)	
1978	Loose Shoes	Billy-Joe	
1978	Goin' South	Parson Weems	
1978	The New Adventures of Wonder Woman	Billy	Episode: "The Deadly Dolphin"
1980	Hardly Working	Gas Station Manager	
1980	High Noon, Part II: The Return of Will Kane	Virgil	
1980	PSI Factor	Biker	
1981	Night Warning	Sergeant Cook	
1981	Three's Company	Angry Husband, Bartender	2 episodes
1982	M*A*S*H	Dan Blevik	Episode: "Heroes"
1984	The Last Starfighter	Mr. Potter	
1984	Silent Night, Deadly Night	Mr.Ira Sims	
1985	Weird Science	Al Wallace	
1987	Baby Boom	Verne Boone	
1988	The Great Outdoors	Reg	
1989	Tales from the Crypt	Pawnbroker	Episode: "Only Sin Deep"
1991	Father of the Bride	Assistant manager of Supermarket	Uncredited (final film role)
1991	Quantum Leap	Vernon Coutis	Episode: "A Single Drop Of Rain"
