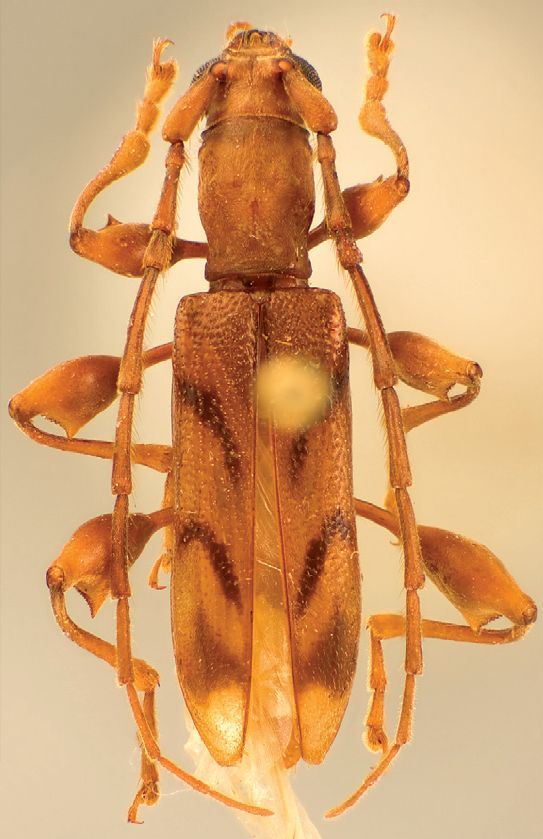

Scientific classification
- Domain: Eukaryota
- Kingdom: Animalia
- Phylum: Arthropoda
- Class: Insecta
- Order: Coleoptera
- Suborder: Polyphaga
- Infraorder: Cucujiformia
- Family: Cerambycidae
- Genus: Plectromerus
- Species: P. roncavei

Binomial name
- Plectromerus roncavei Nearns & Miller, 2009

= Plectromerus roncavei =

Species of beetle

Plectromerus roncavei is a species of beetle in the family Cerambycidae. It was described by Nearns and Miller in 2009.
