= Plectromerus serratus =

Scientific classification
- Domain: Eukaryota
- Kingdom: Animalia
- Phylum: Arthropoda
- Class: Insecta
- Order: Coleoptera
- Suborder: Polyphaga
- Infraorder: Cucujiformia
- Family: Cerambycidae
- Genus: Plectromerus
- Species: P. serratus

Binomial name
- Plectromerus serratus (Cameron, 1910)

Species of beetle

Plectromerus serratus is a species of beetle in the family Cerambycidae. It was described by Cameron in 1910.
