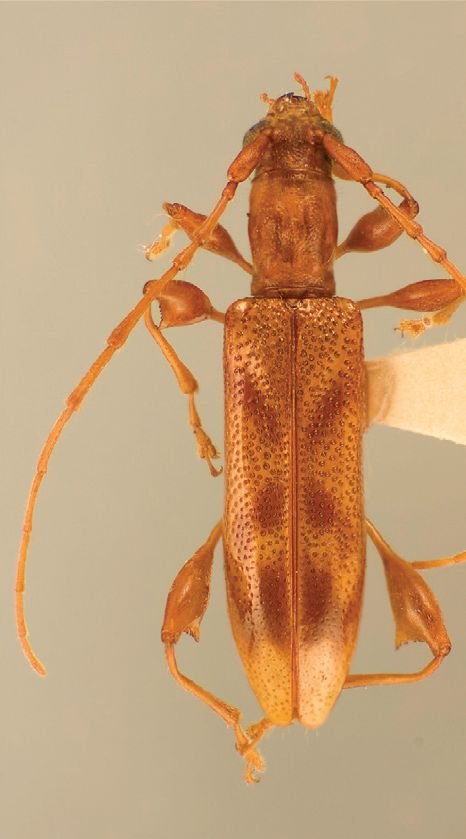
- Female Plectromerus dezayasi

Scientific classification
- Domain: Eukaryota
- Kingdom: Animalia
- Phylum: Arthropoda
- Class: Insecta
- Order: Coleoptera
- Suborder: Polyphaga
- Infraorder: Cucujiformia
- Family: Cerambycidae
- Genus: Plectromerus
- Species: P. dezayasi

Binomial name
- Plectromerus dezayasi Nearns & Branham, 2008

= Plectromerus dezayasi =

Species of beetle

Plectromerus dezayasi is a species of beetle in the family Cerambycidae. It was described by Nearns and Branham in 2008.

The female is 8.0–9.5 mm long and 1.8–2.1 mm wide.; the male is 9.9 mm long and 2.2 mm wide.
