= Plectromerus distinctus =

Scientific classification
- Domain: Eukaryota
- Kingdom: Animalia
- Phylum: Arthropoda
- Class: Insecta
- Order: Coleoptera
- Suborder: Polyphaga
- Infraorder: Cucujiformia
- Family: Cerambycidae
- Genus: Plectromerus
- Species: P. distinctus

Binomial name
- Plectromerus distinctus (Cameron, 1910)

Species of beetle

Plectromerus distinctus is a species of beetle in the family Cerambycidae. It was described by Cameron in 1910. It is more well known as a longhorned beetle, and is used to compare invasive species of beetles to native species of beetles, especially in North America.
