= The Limit (1972 film) =

1972 crime-action film by Yaphet Kotto

- Film poster
- Directed by: Yaphet Kotto
- Written by: Sean Cameron; Yaphet Kotto
- Produced by: Yaphet Kotto
- Starring: Yaphet Kotto; Quinn K. Redeker; Virgil Frye; Corinne Cole; Ted Cassidy; Pamela Jones; Irene Cagen; Gary Littlejohn
- Cinematography: Fenton Hamilton
- Edited by: Norman B. Schwartz
- Music by: Wayne Henderson
- Production companies: New Era Communications; Speed Limit Productions, Inc.
- Distributed by: Cannon Film Distributors
- Release date: November 10, 1972 (NYC)
- Running time: 90 minutes
- Country: United States
- Language: English
- Box office: $25,000

The Limit (a.k.a. Speed Limit 65) is a 1972 independent action-crime film, now considered a lost film, produced and directed by Yaphet Kotto, who also co-wrote it with Sean Cameron. Kotto stars in the lead role, alongside a supporting cast consisting of Virgil Frye, Quinn K. Redeker, Corinne Cole, Ted Cassidy, Pamela Jones, Gary Littlejohn, and Irene Cagen.

== Plot summary ==
Mark Johnson is a Los Angeles motorcycle cop who patrols rough neighborhoods alongside his partner and best friend, Jeff McMillan. After a run-in with a gang known as The Virgins, he soon develops a respectful acquaintanceship with the leader, Big Donnie. He advises Donnie not to allow his pregnant girlfriend, Judy, to ride on motorcycles in her condition. Kenny, the Virgins' second-in-command, reacts with envy and fury.

== Cast ==
- Yaphet Kotto as Mark Johnson
- Quinn K. Redeker as Jeff McMillan
- Virgil Frye as Kenny
- Corinne Cole as Judy
- Ted Cassidy as Big Donnie
- Pamela Jones as Margret
- Gary Littlejohn as Pete
- Irene Cagen as Delores (as Irene Forrest)

== Release ==
It premiered first in June 1972, before being released theatrically on November 10, 1972. This is now considered to be a lost film.

== Reception ==
Roger Greenspun of The New York Times stated that this "is an oddly pleasant, occasionally exciting movie to watch".
