= Corinne Cole =

American model and actress (born 1937)

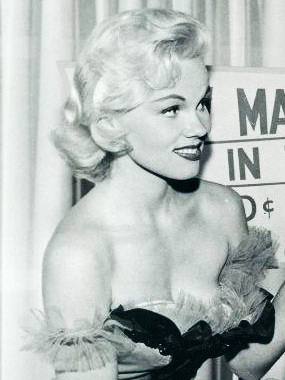
- Cole in 1958

Playboy centerfold appearance
- May 1958
- Preceded by: Felicia Atkins
- Succeeded by: Judy Lee Tomerlin

Personal details
- Born: Corinne Elaine Kegley; April 13, 1937 (age 88); Brentwood, California, U.S.
- Height: 5 ft 9 in (1.75 m)

Corinne Cole (born Corinne Elaine Kegley; April 13, 1937) is an American former Playmate and actress. She was briefly known as Lari Laine early in her career.

== Biography ==
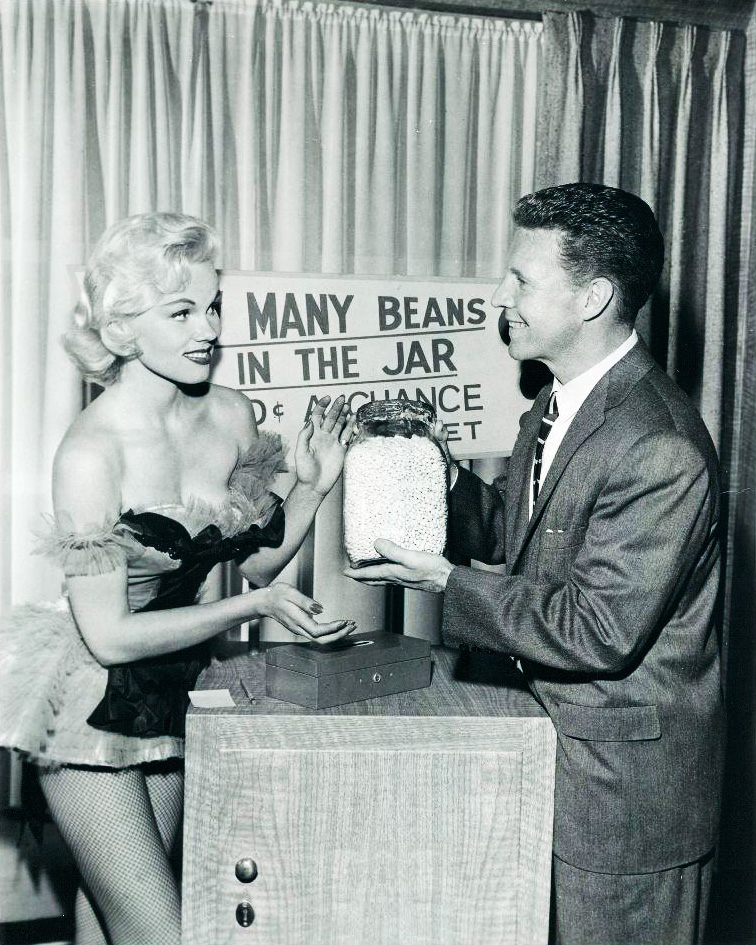
Cole (as Lari Laine) with Ozzie Nelson as a guest star in The Adventures of Ozzie and Harriet, 1958

Cole was born and raised in Brentwood, California, the daughter of Alice Polk Kegley, a former Ziegfeld Girl, and Carl S. Kegley, a criminal-trial attorney. She studied journalism at the University of California at Berkeley. She was Playboy magazine's Playmate of the Month for the May 1958 issue, with her centerfold photographed by Ron Vogel. According to The Playmate Book, Corinne Cole used a pseudonym for her Playboy appearance because her father was considering running for Congress and she didn't want to disrupt those plans.

In 1968, Cole married Sands Hotel boss Jack Entratter; they divorced a few years later. In 1972, she married Roger Heffron; they had a child and divorced in 1980. In 1990, she married director George Sidney, with whom she worked on the 1966 film The Swinger. He died in 2002 after 12 years of marriage to Cole.

== Filmography ==
=== Films ===
- The Lucifer Complex (1978)
- The Limit (1972) .... Judy
- The Party (1968) .... Janice Kane
- Who's Minding the Mint? (1967) .... Doris Miller
- Murderers' Row (1966) .... Miss January
- The Swinger (1966) .... Sir Hubert's Secretary
- The Murder Men (1961) (as Lari Laine)
- Arson for Hire (1959) (as Lari Laine) .... Cindy, the secretary

=== Television ===
- Cannon - "Memo from a Dead Man" (1973) .... Sigurd
- Ironside - "Side Pocket" (1968) .... Judy
- The F.B.I. - "Region of Peril" (1968) .... Linda Soames
- The Monkees - "Wild Monkees" (1967) .... Queenie
- The Adventures of Ozzie & Harriet - "A Wife in the Office" (1964) .... Miss Logan
- Hazel - "Barney Hatfield, Where Are You?" (1962) … Boo-Boo Bedoux
- Bachelor Father - "Bentley and the Beauty Contest" (1959) … Miss Saskatchewan
- Peter Gunn - "The Ugly Frame" (1959) ... uncredited
- You Bet Your Life - #58-08, November 13, 1958 .... Lari Lane

== See also ==
- List of people in Playboy 1953–1959

Elizabeth Ann Roberts	Cheryl Kubert	Zahra Norbo	Felicia Atkins	Lari Laine	Judy Lee Tomerlin
Linné Ahlstrand	Myrna Weber	Teri Hope	Mara Corday, Pat Sheehan	Joan Staley	Joyce Nizzari
