= Outside Chance =

- Based on: Jackson County Jail by Donald E. Stewart
- Written by: Michael Miller; Ralph Gaby Wilson
- Directed by: Michael Miller
- Starring: Yvette Mimieux
- Music by: Murphy Dunne; Lou Levy
- Country of origin: United States
- Original language: English

Production
- Executive producer: Roger Corman
- Producers: Jeff Begun; Richard Shorr
- Cinematography: Willy Kurant
- Editor: Bruce Logan
- Running time: 92 minutes
- Production company: New World Pictures

Original release
- Network: CBS
- Release: 1978

Outside Chance is a 1978 American TV film starring Yvette Mimieux, directed by Michael Miller. It is a radical reworking of Miller's 1976 film Jackson County Jail, which Mimieux had starred in; it contains 30 minutes of footage from the original film, blended with newly shot material. CBS had previously aired Jackson County Jail in prime time to respectable ratings, and Miller pitched the network on an alternate storyline for Mimieux's character, envisioning a potential series for her in the vein of The Fugitive. The film premiered on the network on Saturday, December 2, 1978.

== Plot ==
The story initially follows the same trajectory as Jackson County Jail, with protagonist Dinah Hunter traveling cross-country from Los Angeles, having her car and possessions stolen near a small town, arrested for vagrancy, and assaulted by the night jailer Hobie, whom she beats to death afterward. The film then changes course from the original with Dinah staying in the jail rather than fleeing, intending to plead her case. Coley Blake, the character played by Tommy Lee Jones, is still referenced as being in the jail with her, but because Jones would not consent to the reuse of his scenes, almost all shots and recorded dialogue featuring him were removed: in this new storyline, Blake steals the jailer's keys and escapes from the police station alone.

Dinah is put on trial and transferred to a larger prison, where she is reunited with Lola, one of the hitchhikers that previously stole her car. She learns to adapt to prison life and befriends other inmates. A prison fire provides opportunity for her, Lola, and others to escape. Dinah proceeds to have several unusual interludes with others, including a brief intimate encounter with concert pianist Bill Hill, as she goes about her long-term quest to elude the police and prove her innocence.

== Production ==
Many actors who had appeared in the original Jackson County Jail acted in this new film. Besides Nancy Lee Noble as hijacker Lola, Severn Darden returned as the Jackson County sheriff Dempsey, a character who had not originally survived. Betty Thomas and John Lawlor played characters entirely different from the ones they had played in the original; as such, their scenes from the previous film were not used in the new cut. Scenes from the original with Howard Hesseman and Robert Carradine were repurposed into the new film. The pilot was not taken to series.

== Reception ==
According to a review by frequent Roger Corman chronicler Todd McCarthy, "Except for the loss of Tommy Lee Jones, Outside Chance beats its predecessor on almost all counts, as funnier, subtler, more textured and evenly toned, and less predictable. It's also historically notable as the first independent, non-union movie made for television. " A capsule review in People's "Picks and Pans" section read, "During the lurid course of this made-for-TVer, Yvette Mimieux gets robbed, knocked unconscious, raped, jailed, forced to murder an attacker and caught in a fire. Then she steals and crashes a car, delivers a baby, witnesses death, has an affair, loses him and has another car crash. Those are just the highlights, and even in the Southern Redneck School of Dramatic License, everyone is entitled to an occasional slow day."

The film has not been made available on home video.
