= Plectromerus exis =

Scientific classification
- Domain: Eukaryota
- Kingdom: Animalia
- Phylum: Arthropoda
- Class: Insecta
- Order: Coleoptera
- Suborder: Polyphaga
- Infraorder: Cucujiformia
- Family: Cerambycidae
- Genus: Plectromerus
- Species: P. exis

Binomial name
- Plectromerus exis Zayas, 1975

Species of beetle

Plectromerus exis is a species of beetle in the family Cerambycidae. It was described by Zayas in 1975.

It has been found in Cuba, the Dominican Republic, and Jamaica.

It's holotype is in the Fernando de Zayas Collection in Havana.
