= Plectromerus tertiarius =

Plectromerus tertiarius Temporal range: Burdigalian

Scientific classification
- Kingdom: Animalia
- Phylum: Arthropoda
- Clade: Pancrustacea
- Class: Insecta
- Order: Coleoptera
- Suborder: Polyphaga
- Infraorder: Cucujiformia
- Family: Cerambycidae
- Genus: Plectromerus
- Species: †P. tertiarius

Binomial name
- †Plectromerus tertiarius Vitali, 2005

Extinct species of beetle

Plectromerus tertiarius is an extinct species of beetle in the family Cerambycidae.

It was first described by Vitali in 2005.

Prehistoric specimens were found in Dominican amber on Hispaniola in the Caribbean.
