= Olive Deering =

American actress (1918–1986)

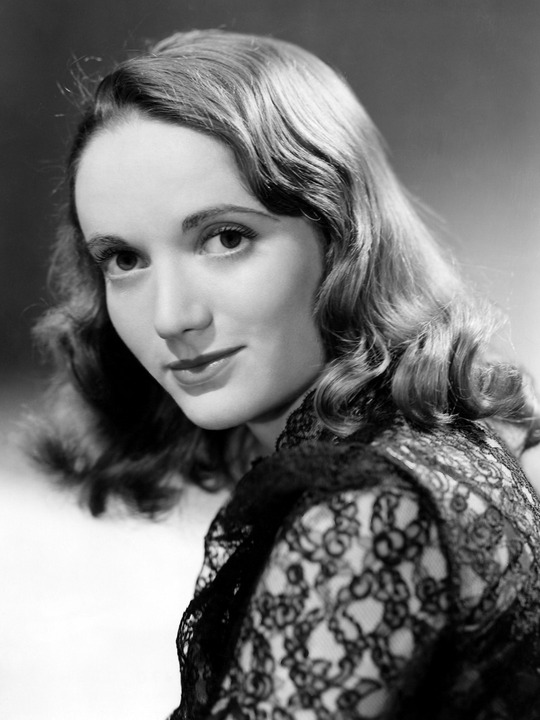
- Deering in 1943
- Born: Olive Corn; October 11, 1918; New York City, U.S.
- Died: March 22, 1986 (aged 67); New York City, U.S.
- Burial place: Kensico Cemetery
- Occupation: Actress
- Years active: 1936–1973
- Spouse(s): Leo Penn (m. 1947; div. 1952) Alan James (1959–1969; his death)
- Relatives: Alfred Ryder (brother)

Olive Deering (née Corn; October 11, 1918 – March 22, 1986) was an American actress of film, television, and stage, active from the late 1940s to the mid-1960s. She was a life member of The Actors Studio, as was her elder brother, Alfred Ryder.

== Early life ==
Deering was the daughter of Zelda "Sadie" (née Baruchin) and Max Corn, a dentist. Her brother was actor Alfred Ryder. She began attending the Professional Children's School when she was age 11.

== Career ==
=== Stage ===
Her first stage role was a walk-on bit in Girls in Uniform (1933). She appeared onstage in Moss Hart's Winged Victory, Richard II (starring Maurice Evans) and Counsellor-at-Law (starring Paul Muni). She received kudos for her performance in the Los Angeles production of Tennessee Williams's Suddenly Last Summer. Other stage appearances included No for an Answer, Ceremony of Innocence, Marathon '33, The Young Elizabeth, They Walk Alone, and Garden District.

In 1940, siblings Deering and Ryder co-starred in Medicine Show on Broadway. In 1980, Deering and Ryder appeared in revival of Tennessee Williams' The Two-Character Play at the studio theater of The Harold Clurman Theater.

=== Film ===
Deering as Miriam, with Edward G. Robinson and Charlton Heston, in The Ten Commandments (1956)

Films she appeared in include Shock Treatment and Caged. In 1948, director Cecil B. DeMille cast her as Miriam, the Danite girl who loves Samson, in his film Samson and Delilah. In his autobiography, DeMille wrote that Deering was "one whose talent and dedication to her art should carry her very far in the theater, whether on screen or stage." DeMille cast her again as the biblical Miriam, sister of Moses, in The Ten Commandments (1956).

=== Radio ===
Deering also appeared on many radio programs including Lone Journey, True Story and Against the Storm, playing in more than 200 television programs, including Desdemona on the Philco Summer Playhouse production of Othello.

=== Television ===
Deering's early television appearances included co-starring in "The Unconquered", an episode of Somerset Maugham TV Theatre, on November 19, 1950, and appearing in an episode of Suspense on June 12, 1951. Others included the role of murderess Rebecca Gentrie in the 1958 Perry Mason episode, "The Case of the Empty Tin". On June 6, 1962, she starred in "Journey to Oblivion", an episode of Armstrong Circle Theatre.

She had a supporting role in the Sci Fi series Outer Limits in the episode "The Zanti Misfits", which aired on December 30, 1963. One of her later television appearances was in an episode of The Alfred Hitchcock Hour, titled "One of the Family" (original air date February 8, 1965).

== Personal life and death ==
Deering married film director Leo Penn on February 19, 1947 in Los Angeles, California. After their divorce, she married Alan James in 1959. He died in 1969.

Deering died of cancer at age 67 and was interred in Kensico Cemetery in Valhalla, New York. She had no children and was survived by her brother, Alfred Ryder.

== Film appearances ==
| Year | Title | Role | Notes |
|---|---|---|---|
| 1948 | Gentleman's Agreement | First Woman | uncredited |
| 1949 | Air Hostess | Helen Field | |
| 1949 | Samson and Delilah | Miriam | |
| 1950 | Caged | June Roberts, Inmate | |
| 1956 | The Ten Commandments | Miriam | |
| 1964 | Shock Treatment | Mrs. Mellon | |
| 1973 | Howzer | Mary Carver | |

== Radio appearances ==
| Year | Program | Episode |
|---|---|---|
| 1951 | Grand Central Station | God's Own Mountain |
| 1953 | Marcia Akers | Marcia Akers |
| 1956 | City Hospital | |

== Television appearances ==
| Year | Program | Episode | Role |
|---|---|---|---|
| 1950 | Television Theater | Portrait in Smoke | |
| 1951 | Kraft Television Theatre | Kelly | Odette |
| 1951 | Danger | Lady on the Rock | Loreli |
| 1951 | Tales of Tomorrow | The Search for the Flying Saucer | |
| 1955 | Studio One Summer Theater | The Pit | |
| 1958 | Shirley Temple's Storybook | The Wild Swant | |
| 1958 | Climax! | Deadly Tattoo | |
| 1959 | Alfred Hitchcock Presents | Season 4 Episode 25: "The Kind Waitress" | Thelma Tompkins |
| 1959 | Johnny Staccato | The Wild Reed | |
| 1959 | One Step Beyond | The Burning Girl | |
| 1960 | Markham | "The Searing Flame" episode | |
| 1960 | Armstrong Circle Theatre | The Numbers Racket | |
| 1963 | The Outer Limits | The Zanti Misfits | |
| 1965 | The Alfred Hitchcock Hour | Season 3 Episode 16: "One of the Family" | Christine Callendar |
