= Howzer =

1973 American independent film

Howzer is a 1973 American independent film directed by Ken Laurence. It was produced by Philip Clarke Kaufman. Laurence wrote the screenplay. It was a U.R.I. Productions film. The film's cast included Peter Desiante, Melissa Stocking, and Royal Dano. It had a two week premiere at the Whitney Museum of American Art in 1973. The film was reviewed by the magazine Variety.

== Plot ==
The plot features a 12 year-old boy and a 14 year-old girl leaving middle class suburbia for a journey to Los Angeles.

== Cast ==
- Royal Dano as Nick Murack
- Olive Deering as Mary Carver
- Virgil Frye as Joe Day
- Peter Desiante as Howard "Howzer" Carsell
- Melissa Stocking as Debora Carsell
- William Gray as Albert Murack
- Edmund Gilbert as Edward Carsell
- Allyn Ann McLerie as Faye Carsell
- Elaine Partnow
- Wonderful Smith
- Stephen Vaughan
- David Dean
- Ed Van Nordic
