= Plectromerus josephi =

Scientific classification
- Domain: Eukaryota
- Kingdom: Animalia
- Phylum: Arthropoda
- Class: Insecta
- Order: Coleoptera
- Suborder: Polyphaga
- Infraorder: Cucujiformia
- Family: Cerambycidae
- Genus: Plectromerus
- Species: P. josephi

Binomial name
- Plectromerus josephi Nearns & Branham, 2008

Species of beetle

Plectromerus josephi is a species of beetle in the family Cerambycidae. It was described by Nearns and Branham in 2008.
