= Plectromerus grimaldii =

Plectromerus grimaldii Temporal range: Burdigalian

Scientific classification
- Kingdom: Animalia
- Phylum: Arthropoda
- Clade: Pancrustacea
- Class: Insecta
- Order: Coleoptera
- Suborder: Polyphaga
- Infraorder: Cucujiformia
- Family: Cerambycidae
- Genus: Plectromerus
- Species: †P. grimaldii

Binomial name
- †Plectromerus grimaldii Nearns & Branham, 2005

Extinct species of beetle

Plectromerus grimaldii is an extinct species of beetle in the family Cerambycidae.

It was first described by Nearns and Branham in 2005.

Prehistoric specimens were found fossilized in Dominican amber on Hispaniola in the Caribbean.
