= Sunny Johnson =

American actress

- Born: September 21, 1953; Bakersfield, California, U.S.
- Died: June 19, 1984 (aged 30); Los Angeles, California, U.S.
- Occupation: Actress
- Years active: 1977–1984
- Partner: Archie Hahn

Sunny Sue Johnson (September 21, 1953 – June 19, 1984) was an American actress. She played figure skater Jeanie in the 1983 film Flashdance.

Johnson died from brain hemorrhage at the age of 30.

== Career ==
Johnson first appeared in the television series Baretta. She also appeared in an episode of Charlie's Angels. She also had roles in the films The Night the Lights Went Out in Georgia and the spoof Dr. Heckyl and Mr. Hype with the English actor Oliver Reed. She appears briefly in the film Animal House as Fawn Liebowitz's sorority housemate at the girl's college during the road trip sequence, and is listed in the film's credits as 'Otter's Co-ed'.

== Death ==
On the night of June 18, 1984, Johnson was found unconscious in the home she shared with her boyfriend, Archie Hahn. She was taken to UCLA Medical Center, where doctors discovered that she had suffered a brain hemorrhage. She remained on life support until the following day when she was declared clinically dead. Without any hope of her mental recovery, her family agreed to take her off life support. Johnson was 30 years old.

== Filmography ==
Year	Title	Role	Notes
1978	Animal House	Otter's Co-Ed	(scenes deleted)
1978	Almost Summer	Debbie	
1980	Where the Buffalo Roam	Lil / Nurse	
1980	Why Would I Lie?		
1980	Nights at O'Rear's	Vi Ann	
1980	Dr. Heckyl and Mr. Hype	Coral Careen	
1981	The Night the Lights Went Out in Georgia	Melody	
1983	Flashdance	Jeanie Szabo	
