= Plectromerus navassae =

Scientific classification
- Domain: Eukaryota
- Kingdom: Animalia
- Phylum: Arthropoda
- Class: Insecta
- Order: Coleoptera
- Suborder: Polyphaga
- Infraorder: Cucujiformia
- Family: Cerambycidae
- Genus: Plectromerus
- Species: P. navassae

Binomial name
- Plectromerus navassae Nearns & Steiner, 2006

Species of beetle

Plectromerus navassae is a species of beetle in the family Cerambycidae, endemic to Navassa Island. It was described by Nearns and Steiner in 2006.
