= Garden of the Dead =

- Directed by: John Hayes
- Written by: Daniel Cady; John Jones
- Produced by: Daniel Cady
- Starring: Phil Kenneally; Duncan McLeod; Susan Charney; John Dullaghan
- Cinematography: Paul Hipp
- Edited by: John Hayes
- Production company: Millenium Productions
- Distributed by: Entertainment Pyramid.
- Release date: August 23, 1972
- Running time: 59 minutes
- Country: United States
- Language: English

Garden of the Dead (also known as Tomb of the Undead) is a 1972 horror film directed by low-budget film director John Hayes and stars Phil Kenneally, Duncan McLeod, Lee Frost and Susan Charney.

== Plot ==
A group of prison inmates in a chain gang obtain some experimental formaldehyde, and get high off of it. They later try to escape and are shot dead. They are buried, and rise again to kill everyone in their path, and to find more formaldehyde from which to get high.

== Cast ==
- Phil Kenneally as Warden
- Duncan McLeod as Dr. Saunders
- John Dullaghan as Sgt. Burns
- John Dennis as Jablonski
- Susan Charney as Carol Johnson
- Marland Proctor as Paul Johnson
- Tony Vorno as Mitchell
- Lee Frost as McGee
- Virgil Frye as Braddock
- Jerome Guardino as Gravedigger
- Carmen Filpi as Nolan

== Production ==
The AFI mentions that "some modern sources claim that the film was shot in ten days in Topanga Canyon, Los Angeles County" from May to late June 1972.

== Release ==
The film premiered in August 1972 by Entertainment Pyramid, and was later distributed on VHS by Troma Entertainment. In 2004, it was featured on a 3-in-1 Troma DVD. In 2006, Troma released it as part of a 15-in-1 pack.

== Reception ==
Writing in The Zombie Movie Encyclopedia, academic Peter Dendle said, "This scruffy low-budget production anticipates the pointless and depressing amateur zombie movies of the early '90s by almost twenty years." Glenn Kay, who wrote Zombie Movies: The Ultimate Guide, said, "It's all incredibly silly, campy stuff." On Evil Dread, the website rated Garden of the Dead 2/10 stars.

Bloody Disgusting included the film's poster in their list of the best posters for bad films.

== See also ==
- List of American films of 1972
