= Plectromerus pseudoexis =

Scientific classification
- Domain: Eukaryota
- Kingdom: Animalia
- Phylum: Arthropoda
- Class: Insecta
- Order: Coleoptera
- Suborder: Polyphaga
- Infraorder: Cucujiformia
- Family: Cerambycidae
- Genus: Plectromerus
- Species: P. pseudoexis

Binomial name
- Plectromerus pseudoexis Vitali & Haxaire, 2007

Species of beetle

Plectromerus pseudoexis is a species of beetle in the family Cerambycidae. It was described by Vitali and Haxaire in 2007.
