= John Dullaghan =

American film, stage and television actor

- Dullaghan in Battlestar Galactica, 1978
- Born: John Joseph Dullaghan III; November 27, 1930; Brooklyn, New York, U.S.
- Died: January 18, 2009 (aged 78); Los Angeles, California, U.S.
- Occupations: Film, stage and television actor

John Joseph Dullaghan III (November 27, 1930 – January 18, 2009) was an American film, stage and television actor. He was best known for playing the recurring role of Dr. Wilker in the American science fiction television series Battlestar Galactica.

Dullaghan was born in Brooklyn, New York. He guest-starred in television programs including Gunsmoke, The Rockford Files, Barnaby Jones, B. J. and the Bear (9 episodes), Night Court, The King of Queens and Cannon, and played the recurring role of Ray Brewer in the ABC sitcom television series Barney Miller. He also appeared in films such as Garden of the Dead, Kalifornia, The Thing with Two Heads, Apollo 13 and Sweet Sweetback's Baadasssss Song. On stage, he appeared in repertory theatre as Pablo in the play Get To the Heart.

Dullaghan died on January 18, 2009 of lung cancer in Los Angeles, California, at the age of 78. His body was cremated.
