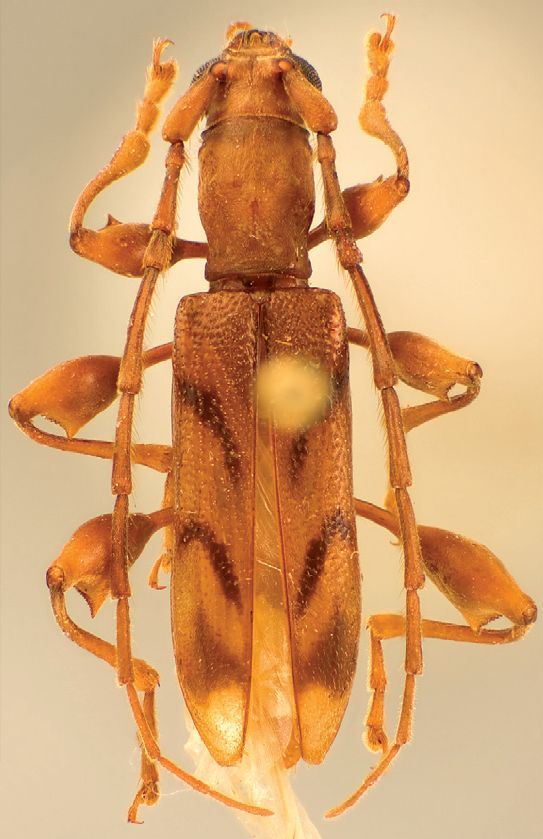
- Plectromerus roncavei (male)

Scientific classification
- Domain: Eukaryota
- Kingdom: Animalia
- Phylum: Arthropoda
- Class: Insecta
- Order: Coleoptera
- Suborder: Polyphaga
- Infraorder: Cucujiformia
- Family: Cerambycidae
- Subfamily: Cerambycinae
- Tribe: Plectromerini; Nearns & Branham 2008
- Genus: Plectromerus; Leconte, 1862

= Plectromerus =

Genus of beetles

Plectromerus is a genus of beetles in the subfamily Cerambycinae, and sole member of the tribe Plectromerini. It contains the following species:

- Plectromerus acunai (Fisher, 1936)
- Plectromerus bidentatus Fisher, 1942
- Plectromerus dentipes (Olivier, 1790)
- Plectromerus dezayasi Nearns & Branham, 2008
- Plectromerus distinctus (Cameron, 1910)
- Plectromerus dominicanus (Micheli, 1983)
- Plectromerus exis Zayas, 1975
- Plectromerus fasciatus (Gahan, 1895)
- Plectromerus femoratus (Fabricius, 1792)
- Plectromerus giesberti Nearns & Branham, 2008
- †Plectromerus grimaldii Nearns & Branham, 2005
- Plectromerus hovorei Nearns & Branham, 2008
- Plectromerus josephi Nearns & Branham, 2008
- Plectromerus lingafelteri Micheli & Nearns, 2005
- Plectromerus louisantoini Dalens & Touroult, 2007
- Plectromerus michelii Nearns & Branham, 2008
- Plectromerus morrisi Nearns & Branham, 2008
- Plectromerus navassae Nearns & Steiner, 2006
- Plectromerus ornatus Fisher, 1947
- Plectromerus pinicola Zayas, 1975
- Plectromerus pseudoexis Vitali & Haxaire, 2007
- Plectromerus pumilus Cazier & Lacey, 1952
- Plectromerus ramosi Micheli & Nearns, 2005
- Plectromerus roncavei Nearns & Miller, 2009
- Plectromerus serratus (Cameron, 1910)
- †Plectromerus tertiarius Vitali, 2005
- Plectromerus thomasi Nearns & Branham, 2008
- Plectromerus turnbowi Nearns & Branham, 2008
- Plectromerus unidentatus Fisher, 1942
- Plectromerus wappesi Giesbert, 1985
