= Charles Howerton =

American actor

- Born: Charles Cabaness Howerton III; June 24, 1938 (age 88); Cuero, Texas, U.S.
- Occupation: Actor
- Years active: 1965–present
- Spouses: Susan Howard (m. 1962; div. 1964) Linda Gary (m. 1967; died 1995) Jeanne Page (m. 1996)
- Children: 3

Charles Howerton (born June 24, 1938) is an American actor. He is best known for such films and television series as The Black Gestapo, Eat My Dust, Up from the Depths, Smokey Bites the Dust, Dr. Heckyl and Mr. Hype, and Assassination.

An acting student of Daws Butler, Howerton has done voices on animated films and series such as G.I. Joe: The Rise of Cobra, Wolfen, and The Iron Giant.

== Personal life ==
Howerton was married to actress Susan Howard from 1962 to 1964 until their divorce. They had one daughter, Lynn. Howerton was married to actress Linda Gary from December 21, 1967, to her death in October 1995. They had two daughters, Dana and Alexis.

== Selected filmography ==
=== Film ===
Year	Title	Role	Notes
1971	Confessions of a Police Captain	Gammino	English version; uncredited
1971	Four Flies on Grey Velvet	Andrea	English version; uncredited
1972	What Have You Done to Solange?	Phillip Sullivan	English version; uncredited
1972	The Sicilian Connection	NYC Capo, Ankaran Man	English version; uncredited
1972	The Grand Duel	Philip Vermeer	English version; uncredited
1972	The Fighting Fist of Shanghai Joe	Shanghai Joe	English version
1975	The Black Gestapo	Joe	
1976	Eat My Dust!	Jay Beah	
1977	Joyride to Nowhere	Sheriff Smith	
1979	Up from the Depths	David Whiting	
1980	Dr. Heckyl and Mr. Hype	Clutch Cooger	
1981	Wolfen	ESS Voice	
1981	Smokey Bites the Dust	Sheriff Bleed	
1981	Choices	Announcer	
1987	Assassination	Calvin Craig	
1987	Programmed to Kill	Benedict	
1992	Chaplin	Dinner Guest	
1996	White Cargo	Ship Captain	
2001	Cats & Dogs	German Shepherd (voice)	Uncredited
2003	Doctor Benny	Gary Fitz	
2004	The Work and the Glory	Land Agent	
2005	XXX: State of the Union	News Anchor	Uncredited
2005	Demon Hunter	Inquisitor	
2008	The Onion Movie	Pentagon General	
2009	G.I. Joe: The Rise of Cobra	Foreign General	
2010	The Land of the Astronauts	Jack's Father	

=== Television ===
Year	Title	Role	Notes
1993	Batman: The Animated Series	Lennie, Captor (voice)	2 episodes
1995	Fantastic Four	Ulysses Klaue (voice)	Episode: "Prey of the Black Panther"
1996	The Sylvester & Tweety Mysteries	Professor Olafsen (voice)	Episode: "A Fist Full of Lutefisk"
1996	Pinky and the Brain	Cribbage (voice)	Episode: "The Third Mouse"
1996	The Real Adventures of Jonny Quest	Vice President (voice)	Episode: "Alien in Washington"
1996	Superman: The Animated Series	Hans, Whirly Pilot (voice)	Episode: "The Last Son of Krypton"
1998	Godzilla: The Series	Ted Hoffman (voice)	Episode: "Leviathan"
2003	Justice League	Armed Man (voice)	Episode: "Maid of Honor"
2005–2007	A.T.O.M.	Kip Hawkes (voice)	12 episodes
2018	The Assassination of Gianni Versace: American Crime Story	Elderly Man	Episode: "Alone"

=== Video games ===
Year	Title	Role	Notes
1995	Labyrinth of Crete	Somnus	
