= Virgil Frye =

American actor

- Born: Virgil Charles Frye; August 21, 1930; Lenox Township, Illinois, U.S.
- Died: May 7, 2012 (aged 81); Orange County, California, U.S.
- Occupations: Film and television actor; boxer
- Years active: 1966–2004
- Children: Sean Frye; Soleil Moon Frye

Virgil Charles Frye (August 21, 1930 – May 7, 2012) was a Golden Gloves boxing champion who became an actor.

He grew up in Estherville, Iowa. He had two children, Sean Frye (E.T. The Extra Terrestrial) and Soleil Moon Frye (Punky Brewster), and was the father-in-law of Jason Goldberg.

Frye made an uncredited appearance in the 1969 film Easy Rider while working as a makeup artist. His credited films included roles in Nightmare in Wax (1969), The Jesus Trip (1971), Garden of the Dead (1972), Deadhead Miles (1973), The Cat Creature (1973), The Klansman (1974), Bobbie Jo and the Outlaw (1976), The Missouri Breaks (1976), Up from the Depths (1979), Dr. Heckyl and Mr. Hype (1980), Graduation Day (1981), Take This Job and Shove It (1981), Revenge of the Ninja (1983), Running Hot (1984), The Burning Bed (1984), Winners Take All (1987), Colors (1988), The Secret of the Ice Cave (1989), The Hot Spot (1990), Man Trouble (1992) and S.F.W. (1994).

Frye suffered from Pick's Disease or Frontotemporal dementia (FTD). He was the subject of a documentary made by his daughter, titled Sonny Boy, which documents a trip that Frye and his daughter, Soleil Moon Frye, took to his hometown, and the effect his illness has had on their relationship. Virgil Frye died at an Orange County nursing home on May 7, 2012.

== Filmography ==
Year	Title	Role	Notes
1966	Queen of Blood		
1967	Hells Angels on Wheels	Biker #1	
1969	Easy Rider	Biker	Uncredited
1969	Nightmare in Wax	Ralph Tenier	
1971	The Jesus Trip	Folsom	
1971	Arde baby, arde	Poggin	
1972	Deadhead Miles	Trouble Maker	
1972	Garden of the Dead	Bradock	
1972	The Limit	Kenny	
1972	The All American Hustler	Yoga Guy	Uncredited
1973	Howzer	Joe Day	
1973	The Cat Creature	Donovan	TV movie
1974	The Klansman	Johnson	
1976	Bobbie Jo and the Outlaw	Joe Grant	
1976	The Missouri Breaks	Woody	
1977	The Great Gundown	John Bayers	
1978	Uncle Joe Shannon	Physical Therapist	
1979	Up from the Depths	Earl Sullivan	
1980	Dr. Heckyl and Mr. Hype	Lt. Mack Druck - 'Il Topo'	
1980	Borderline	Bandit Leader	
1981	The Postman Always Rings Twice	Crapshooter	
1981	Take This Job and Shove It	Cleach	
1981	Graduation Day	MacGregor	
1983	Revenge of the Ninja	Lt. Dime	
1984	Running Hot	Ross	
1984	Hot Moves	The Porno Man	
1984	The Burning Bed	Virg	TV movie
1987	Winners Take All	Sam	
1988	Colors	Sheriff Foster	
1988	Dance Academy		
1989	Trust Me	Thug	
1989	The Secret of the Ice Cave	Frank Hagen	
1990	Pacific Palisades	L'homme à la casquette	
1990	The Hot Spot	Deputy Buck	
1992	Man Trouble	Sturge	
1994	S.F.W.	Earl	
1995	The Nature of the Beast	Gas station attendant	
1995	Xtro 3: Watch the Skies	Survivor	
1995	Wild Bill	Buffalo Hunter	
1998	Killer Flick	Sheriff	
2004	Bob's Night Out	Waldo Z. Lizst	Final film role
