= Plectromerus femoratus =

Scientific classification
- Kingdom: Animalia
- Phylum: Arthropoda
- Class: Insecta
- Order: Coleoptera
- Suborder: Polyphaga
- Infraorder: Cucujiformia
- Family: Cerambycidae
- Genus: Plectromerus
- Species: P. femoratus

Binomial name
- Plectromerus femoratus (Fabricius, 1792)

Species of beetle

Plectromerus femoratus is a species of beetle in the family Cerambycidae. It was described by Johan Christian Fabricius in 1792.
