= John Lawlor (actor) =

American actor (1941–2025)

- Born: June 5, 1941; Troy, New York, U.S.
- Died: February 13, 2025 (aged 83); Albuquerque, New Mexico, U.S.
- Occupation: Actor
- Years active: 1975–2017
- Spouse: Tantoo Cardinal (divorced)
- Children: 6

John Henry Lawlor III (June 5, 1941 – February 13, 2025) was an American actor and assistant director.

== Early life ==
Lawlor was born on June 5, 1941, in Troy, New York, but spent much of his early life in Boulder, Colorado, where his mother was a teacher of special needs children at Casey Jr. High School. In the late-1960s, he worked as a AmeriCorps Seniors volunteer trainer in Denver.

== Career ==
His best known roles were Supervisor Leonard Marsh on the television series Phyllis from 1976 to 1977, and later of Headmaster Steven Bradley on the television series The Facts of Life from 1979 to 1980. The name Steven Bradley was likely meant as a tribute to Steve Bradley in Boulder, a friend and one-time manager of the Winter Park ski area.

He also guest-starred in L.A. Law, Knots Landing, Mr. Belvedere, Barney Miller, The Rockford Files, Ellery Queen, Baa Baa Black Sheep, and Alice. He played the locksmith exhorted by Skylar White in Breaking Bad.

He appeared in the movies National Lampoon's Movie Madness (1982), S.O.B. (1981), Billy Jack Goes to Washington (1977), The Gumball Rally (1976), Wyatt Earp (1994) and Mr. Fixit (1988).

In a 1980s TV commercial for Malt-O-Meal hot cereal, he played a father telling his son's invisible friend that Malt-O-Meal was, "Good stuff, Maynard!" a line which became a popular phrase.

== Personal life and death ==
Lawlor was divorced from Tantoo Cardinal, with whom he had two children. He also had four other children.

Lawlor died in Albuquerque, New Mexico, on February 13, 2025, at the age of 83.

== Filmography ==
=== Film ===
Year	Title	Role	Notes
1976	Jackson County Jail	Deputy Burt	
1976	The Gumball Rally	Jake	
1977	Billy Jack Goes to Washington	Dan McArthur	
1981	S.O.B.	Capitol Studios Manager	
1982	National Lampoon's Movie Madness	Mr. Haggis	
1994	Wyatt Earp	Judge Spicer	
2011	Naked Run	Max Siegel	
2011	The Reunion	Lenny Cleary	
2016	Gold	Mining Expert	

=== Television ===
Year	Title	Role	Notes
1975	The Rockford Files	Dave Kruger	Episode: "Resurrection in Black & White"
1975	Ellery Queen	Director / Radio Technician	2 episodes
1976	The Bureau	Agent Butterfield	Television film
1976	Baa Baa Black Sheep	Dr. Jim Reese	Episode: "Flying Misfits"
1976–1977	Phyllis	Leonard Marsh / Officer Hale	25 episodes
1977	Relentless	Walker	Television film
1977	Alice	Henderson	Episode: "The Sixty Minutes Man"
1978	Outside Chance	Bill Hill	Television film
1978	Barney Miller	Morris the Dogcatcher	Episode: "Dog Days"
1979	A New Kind of Family	Tom	Episode: "Are You Sure Barnum and Bailey Started Like This?"
1979–1980	The Facts of Life	Steven Bradley	13 episodes
1980	United States	Josh	Episode: "Josh"
1981	A Matter of Life and Death	Bud Coggins	Television film
1981	Here's Boomer	John Hawthorne	Episode: "Boomer in the Pound"
1981	Why Us?	Jules Sanborn	Television film
1982	Cassie & Co.	Merritt	Episode: "Dark Side of the Moon"
1982	Newhart	Director of Vermont Today	Episode: "Vermont Today"
1984	T. J. Hooker	Charles Bowers	Episode: "Pursuit"
1984	Simon & Simon	Scott Banfield	Episode: "Almost Completely Out of Circulation"
1984	ABC Weekend Special	Paul Landry	Episode: "Henry Hamilton Graduate Ghost"
1985	The Best Times	Willis Troutman	Episode: "Snake Meat"
1985, 1987	Highway to Heaven	Brad / Earl	2 episodes
1986	Stingray	Dr. Jimmy Monroe	Episode: "That Terrible Swift Sword"
1986	Sledge Hammer!	Chief Reisner	Episode: "Under the Gun"
1987	She's the Sheriff	Diamond	Episode: "Max Moves In"
1988–1989	The Bold and the Beautiful	Walter Talbert	4 episodes
1989	Mr. Belvedere	Dr. Peterson	Episode: "Fear of Flying"
1990	After the Shock	Fireman	Television film
1991	The New Lassie	Jim Berger	Episode: "Kitty Saver"
1992	FBI: The Untold Stories	Steve Gates	Episode: "Millionaire Murderer"
1992–1993	Knots Landing	Larry Lambert	4 episodes
1993	L.A. Law	Howard Bowling	Episode: "Bourbon County"
1999	Hercules: The Legendary Journeys	Horatius	Episode: "Stranger and Stranger"
2003	The Lyon's Den	Mr. Dilby	Episode: "Privileged"
2004	Cold Case	Father Declan	Episode: "Glued"
2005	McBride: Tune in for Murder	Don	Television film
2008	The Roaring Twenties	Gary	Miniseries
2009	In Plain Sight	Judge John Metcalf	Episode: "Who's Bugging Mary?"
2010	Scoundrels	Herbert West	3 episodes
2011	Breaking Bad	Locksmith	Episode: "Box Cutter"
2014	Killer Women	Judge Walter Garrity	Episode: "Some Men Need Killing"
2014	Longmire	Oren Mallory	Episode: "Miss Cheyenne"
2014	Outlaw Prophet: Warren Jeffs	Judge Shumate	Television film
2016	Graves	Dr. Mirsky	Episode: "A Tincture of Madness"
2017	Godless	Elmer Knowland	4 episodes
