= Killer Flick =

- US film poster
- Directed by: Mark Weidman
- Screenplay by: Mark Weidman
- Produced by: Mark Weidman; Chip Smith
- Starring: Tod Thawley; Christian Leffler; Emmett Grennan; Creighton Howard; Fred Dennis; Kathleen Macdonald; Virgil Frye
- Cinematography: Robert Stenger
- Edited by: Michael Addis; Mark Weidman
- Music by: Kyle Van Horn; Michael Zamboni
- Production companies: On the Road, LP; Smile House Production
- Distributed by: Mainline Releasing (original release)
- Release date: 1998
- Running time: 93 minutes
- Country: United States
- Language: English
- Budget: $250,000

Killer Flick is a 1998 American independent black comedy road film written and directed by Mark Weidman that follows a group of people as they go on a crime spree and film their own activities.

== Production ==
Writer/director Mark Weidman quit his day job as a teacher and, along with his brother-in-law Chip Smith, formed Smile House Production in order to make the film. Together, Weidman and Smith "cobbled together $250,000 for a 13-day guerrilla shoot". For use in the film, Smith arranged construction of a gas station set on a property near Barstow to be blown up as an effect for the film.

== Plot summary ==
The film centers on four aspiring filmmakers, Rome, Buzz, Max, and One-Eye, who go on a surreal rampage and make their exploits into a movie. While evading law enforcement, the filmmakers discuss their plans on how to make their movie as violent and sexy as possible so that they can sell it for a lot of money.

After the group blows up a gas station, Rome flirts with Tess, an attractive woman he meets on the street, and tries to cast her. He gives her a copy of the script to audition, but after reading it, she disgustedly argues with the group about the shallow, adolescent nature of their movie. The argument is part of the script, however, and Tess passes the audition. The group orchestrates a few more scenes of violence for the movie, at times by recruiting bystanders at gunpoint to play roles, while other times creating situations simply by writing them into the script.

Needing a villain for the movie, the group decides to kidnap their favorite B-movie star, Virgil Morgan, and force him to participate. They arrive at Virgil's Hollywood home and abduct him. After a few unsuccessful attempts to film a scene, Virgil tutors the group on basic filmmaking skills. Most of the actors that appear in the film, including those whose characters have already been killed, gather in Virgil's living room and perform a read-through of the script.

The group orchestrates a climactic car chase and gun battle. During the chase, the group decides to name their movie "Killer Flick", with the tagline "Because we'd kill to make a movie". At the end of the chase, Tess is shot and killed. The group tearfully cremates her, consoled in the knowledge that her death was required by the traditional structures of screenwriting.

== Cast ==
The film's onscreen credits offer a film-within-a-film credits list for the characters: "Rome" as Director, "One Eye" as Photographer, "Max" as Script, "Buzz" as Music, and "Tess" as Love Interest, followed by onscreen credits for the actors:

- Tod Thawley as Rome (as Zen Todd)
- Christian Leffler as One Eye
- Emmett Grennan as Max
- Creighton Howard as Buzz
- Kathleen Macdonald as Tess (as Kathleen Walsh)
- Fred Dennis as Virgil Morgan
- Virgil Frye as Sheriff
- Kareem Oliver as Rodney
- Kyle Van Horne as Lyle
- Karen Christensen as Red Hill Waitress
- Sheri Hellard as Waitress at Fuzzy's
- Casey Slade as Pastry Face Cop
- Jon Kinney as Grip
- Richard T. Smith as Sheriff'S Deputy
- Judi O'Neal as Sadie

== Reception ==
Critical reception has been mixed. DVD Talk gave a mostly negative review that opined that the commentary track might be useful for prospective indie low-budget filmmakers, but that the movie itself was "weak" and "tough to sit through". Kevin Thomas of the Los Angeles Times gave a brief but enthusiastic review that called Killer Flick "an outrageous, inspired satire". In his book "The Reality Effect: Film Culture and the Graphic Imperative", author and scholar Joel Black referred to the film as "an over the top black comedy". LA Weekly reviewer Chuck Wilson remarks upon the film's scene where the group's leader and film-within-a-film-director, Rome (played by Tod Thawley), shows attraction for the lead actress "in order to give the movie a 'love interest'" and then apologizes to the rest of his group for his "lousy dialogue". The reviewer felt that director Weidman cut to rehearsals where the actors to be killed off try out various bits of dialog, and in noting the cast agreeing that the film is becoming too "self-referential" s and says so out loud, was astute in "beating the audience to the punch." It was concluded that "Miramax would love these guys." San Francisco Weekly noted "Mark Weidman shows how to graft a grade-Z road movie onto a Brechtian scenario of self-reflexivity and narrative breakdown," and concluded he was able to "make a breathless, funny, inventive film."

== Releases ==
The film had festival screenings in 1998 and 1999, and was released on DVD by Vanguard Cinema in 2003. The film had theatrical release when the Laemmle Theatres in West Los Angeles showed the film as a midnight feature on Friday and Saturday nights. Crowds were large enough that they extended the run.
