= Sean Frye =

American former child actor (born 1966)

- Born: Sean Anthony Frye; September 16, 1966 (age 59); Los Angeles, California, U.S.
- Occupation: Actor
- Years active: 1974–1988
- Spouse: Rita Saguin (m. 1987; div. 1992)
- Father: Virgil Frye
- Relatives: Soleil Moon Frye (half-sister)

Sean Anthony Frye (born September 16, 1966) is an American former actor. His best-known role was as Steve, the sunglass-toting friend of Elliott Taylor (Henry Thomas)'s older brother Michael (Robert MacNaughton) in E.T. the Extra-Terrestrial.

His last made-for-television film was Toughlove (1985), where he played the role of Tim, a drug-involved teenager whose addiction caused him to steal from his family. Frye's last feature film was Molly Ringwald's For Keeps (1988) about teenage pregnancy.

Beyond acting, Frye was wardrobe consultant on the 1983 film Valley Girl.

Frye was born in Hollywood, California. Actress Soleil Moon Frye is his half-sister; their father was actor Virgil Frye.

== Filmography ==
=== Film ===
- Fun with Dick and Jane (1977) as Billy
- The Awakening Land (1978) as Resolve Wheeler
- Loose Shoes (1980) as Bobby the S.T.O.P.-I.T. Poster Boy
- E.T. the Extra-Terrestrial (1982) as Steve
- This Is Spinal Tap (1984) as Jordan St. Hubbins, David's Punk Rocker Son (scenes deleted)
- Real Genius (1985) as Boy at Science Fair
- For Keeps (1988) as Wee Willy

=== Television ===
- Emergency! (1 episode, 1974) as Boy
- A Special Olivia Newton-John (1976) as Nigel
- A Circle of Children (1977) as Sean
- The Awakening Land (2 episodes, 1978) as Resolve Wheeler
- Little House on the Prairie (2 episodes, 1979) as Jason
- Act of Violence (1979) as Jamie
- ABC Afterschool Special (1 episode, 1985) as Punk Boyfriend
- Toughlove (1985) as Tim
