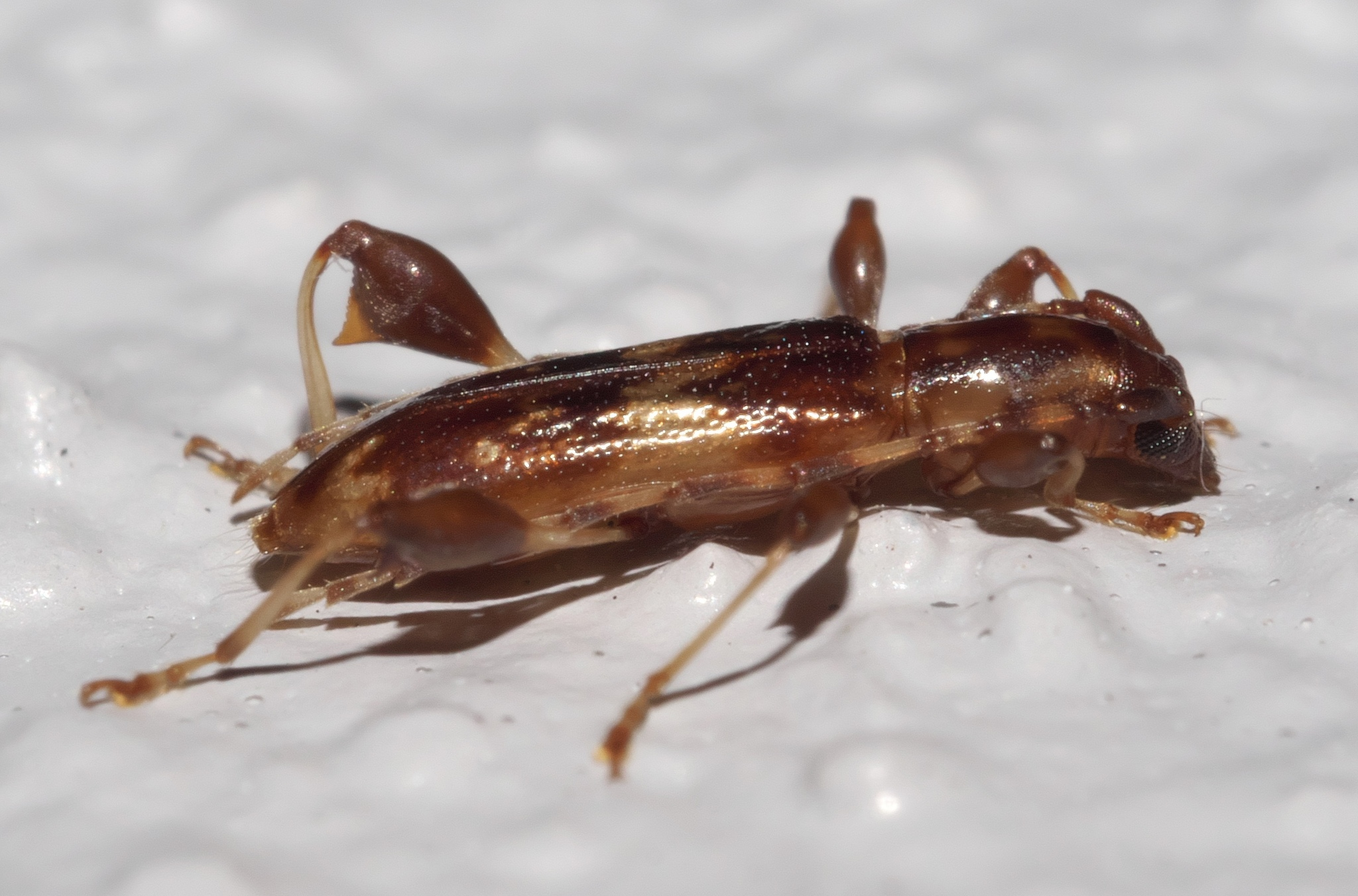
- Plectromerus dentipes, tooth-footed bycid, Florida

Scientific classification
- Kingdom: Animalia
- Phylum: Arthropoda
- Clade: Pancrustacea
- Class: Insecta
- Order: Coleoptera
- Suborder: Polyphaga
- Infraorder: Cucujiformia
- Family: Cerambycidae
- Genus: Plectromerus
- Species: P. dentipes

Binomial name
- Plectromerus dentipes (Olivier, 1790)

= Plectromerus dentipes =

Species of beetle

Plectromerus dentipes, the tooth-footed bycid, is a species of typical longhorn beetle belonging to the Cerambycidae family. It is found in the North America, the Caribbean, and the Bahamas.
