= Dr. Heckyl and Mr. Hype =

- Film poster
- Directed by: Charles B. Griffith
- Written by: Charles B. Griffith
- Produced by: Yoram Globus; Menahem Golan
- Starring: Oliver Reed; Sunny Johnson
- Cinematography: Robert Primes
- Edited by: Skip Schoolnik
- Music by: Richard Band
- Color process: Metrocolor
- Production company: Golan-Globus Productions
- Distributed by: Cannon Film Distributors
- Release date: October 1980
- Running time: 98 minutes
- Country: United States
- Language: English
- Budget: $750,000

Dr. Heckyl and Mr. Hype is a 1980 American comedy-drama horror romance film directed by Charles B. Griffith, starring Oliver Reed and Sunny Johnson.

== Plot ==
The film is a reversal of Robert Louis Stevenson's 1886 Dr. Jekyll and Mr. Hyde story, about a malformed doctor who drinks a potion and becomes a handsome (and violent) ladies' man.

== Cast ==
- Oliver Reed as Dr. Henry Heckyl / Mr. Hype
- Sunny Johnson as Coral Careen
- Maia Danziger as Miss Finebum
- Virgil Frye as Lieutenant Mack Druck
- Mel Welles as Dr. Vince Hinkle
- Kedrick Wolf as Dr. Lew Hoo
- Jackie Coogan as Sergeant Fleacollar
- Corinne Calvet as Pizelle Puree
- Sharon Compton as Mrs. Quivel
- Denise Hayes as Liza Rowne
- Charles Howerton as "Clutch" Cooger
- Dick Miller as Irsil / Orson
- Lucretia Love as Debra Kate
- Tony Cox as William "Bad William"

== Production ==
Griffith says the film's title was one of five joke titles he originally came up with to show Francis Ford Coppola. He then showed them to Menahem Golan, who was talking to Griffith about writing The Happy Hooker Goes to Washington. After that fell through, Golan asked if Griffith had any other ideas. Griffith pitched him Dr Feelgood and Mr Hype, a black comedy about a hippie who invents a new drug that turns everyone into advertising executives. Golan agreed, but insisted that "the ugly guy is the good guy.”

Griffith says he had only three weeks to write and prepare the film, four weeks to shoot and two weeks to edit. He was paid $25,000 to write and $25,000 to direct. Griffith originally wanted Dick Van Dyke to play the lead, but since Van Dyke was touring in a play at the time and was unavailable, Golan hired Oliver Reed. Griffith said, "I had to redo the entire picture in my head when he was cast, because it was a zany slapstick comedy and I got Oliver Reed – with that face and that voice! So I made it more lyrical."

Sunny Johnson was cast the day before shooting started. The script ran to 200 pages in length, and Griffith admits he never had time to cut it down properly. He also said he "fought with the producers over blood and gore versus comedy, and lost as usual." Griffith offered a role to old actor friend Jonathan Haze, who turned it down. However, Dick Miller and Mel Welles appear.

== Reception ==
According to Griffith, Cannon could not release the film and it was sold to cable television:

Heckyl and Hype could have been a very good picture. Dr. Heckyl is a monster podiatrist. He is very humble and meek and helpful and nice to everybody. His attitude is that good-looking guys can get away with murder. Oliver was great as Heckyl. Wonderful. He played the part with a kind of New York accent and everything, but when he was Hype, he didn't know how to do it… Reed played Hype as Oliver Reed, slow and ponderous. He didn't understand my interpretation, so the picture jars, and half the people get up and walk out.
