= The Night the Lights Went Out in Georgia (film) =

1981 film by Ronald F. Maxwell

- Theatrical release poster
- Directed by: Ronald F. Maxwell
- Written by: Bob Bonney
- Produced by: Bill Blake
- Starring: Kristy McNichol; Dennis Quaid; Mark Hamill; Don Stroud; Arlen Dean Snyder; Barry Corbin
- Cinematography: Bill Butler
- Edited by: Anne Goursaud
- Music by: Keith Allison; Bobbie Gentry; Mark Lindsay; David Shire
- Distributed by: AVCO Embassy Pictures
- Release date: May 29, 1981
- Running time: 112 minutes
- Country: United States
- Language: English
- Budget: $7.5 million
- Box office: $14 million or $6.1 million

The Night the Lights Went Out in Georgia is a 1981 American musical drama film starring Kristy McNichol, Dennis Quaid, Mark Hamill and Don Stroud, directed by Ronald F. Maxwell.

It was very loosely inspired by the 1972 Vicki Lawrence song of the same name (it shares almost no plot elements with the original song). In 1981, Tanya Tucker recorded a different version for the film's soundtrack and new lyrics related to the plot of the film were written. These altered lyrics were based on the plot line of the movie, which is not the same as the story of the original song.

== Plot ==
A young singer and his sister/manager travel to Nashville in search of stardom. As they journey from one grimy hotel to another, it becomes increasingly obvious that only one of them has what it takes to become a star.

Travis Child (Quaid) is a country singer who had one hit song and then faded from the scene. His ambitious younger sister, Amanda (McNichol), is determined to get them to Nashville where Travis can once again become a star. Her plans are derailed by Travis's lack of ambition and easy distraction by women and booze. Amanda meets a state trooper named Conrad (Hamill) who shows concern for her.

The two are separated in one town and by the time they find each other in the next one, Travis has been arrested for public drunkenness. To pay the fine he takes a job bartending at a roadside tavern called Andy's, where he meets and falls for a young woman named Melody with a very jealous ex-boyfriend—who happens to be the deputy sheriff named Seth James. Seth wounds Travis in an ambush. Travis hides in the floorboards of his truck and pretends to be dead. When Seth yanks open Travis's truck door to put another round in him, Travis kills him with a gun he was hiding. Travis, in bad shape, takes Seth's car and ends up driving it off the road, dying. Amanda buries Travis and hugs Melody good bye. She heads down the road with her dog. Conrad, in his police car tries to convince Amanda not to leave but she says she's going. Conrad goes to his cruiser, strips to his underwear to show that he is leaving everything behind for her, and convinces Amanda that they'll go together.

== Cast ==
- Kristy McNichol as Amanda Child
- Dennis Quaid as Travis Child
- Mark Hamill as Conrad
- Sunny Johnson as Melody
- Don Stroud as Seth James
- Barry Corbin as Wimbish
- Arlen Dean Snyder as Andy
- Ellen Saland as Nellie

== Production ==
The film was shot on location in Dade County, Georgia, but some scenes were filmed around Fort Oglethorpe, Georgia, and Chattanooga and Manchester, Tennessee, as well.

== Reception ==
On Metacritic — which assigns a weighted mean score — the film has a score of 54 out of 100 based on 5 critics, indicating "mixed or average reviews".
