= Up from the Depths =

1979 horror film by Charles B. Griffith

Up From the Depths
- Theatrical release poster
- Directed by: Charles B. Griffith
- Written by: Anne Dyer; Alfred Sweeney
- Produced by: Jack Atienza; Cirio H. Santiago
- Starring: Sam Bottoms; Susanne Reed; Virgil Frye; Kedric Wolfe; Charles Howerton
- Cinematography: Ricardo Remias
- Edited by: G. V. Bass
- Music by: James Horner & Russell O’Malley
- Distributed by: New World Pictures; Shout Factory (DVD)
- Release date: June 29, 1979
- Running time: 75 minutes
- Country: United States
- Language: English

Up From the Depths is a 1979 horror film directed by Charles B. Griffith and starring Sam Bottoms, Susanne Reed, Virgil Frye, Kedric Wolfe, and Charles Howerton. The film, along with many other natural horror films at the time of its release, was made due to the success of Jaws.

== Plot ==
The staff and vacationers at a first-class resort on the island of Maui are beginning to mysteriously disappear. A biologist believes that an underwater earthquake has caused a giant and very hungry dormant prehistoric fish to be released from its slumber. The fish voraciously helps itself to a tourist buffet. Now it is open season for the local fishermen to find and kill the creature.

== Cast ==
- Sam Bottoms - Greg Oliver
- Susanne Reed - Rachel McNamara
- Virgil Frye - Earl Sullivan
- Kedric Wolfe - Oscar Forbes
- Charles Howerton - Dr. David Whiting
- Denise Hayes - Iris Lee
- R. Lee Ermey - Lee

== Production ==
Charles B Griffith later called making the film a "terrible experience".

We had it written by one of the typists or secretaries in the office who didn't have any thoughts of becoming a writer. I think Roger did it to punish me, to send me out to The Philippines where I didn't know what I was getting into. I was making an action picture, but The Philippines people were all so depressed, and they had made this goofy-looking fish with bug eyes. I told them that we'll make it a comedy, and their eyes lit up! So I sent back a comedy on one plane, and I arrived on the next one. By the time I arrived, Roger had already cut 75 minutes out. As an editor would say, "That's a set-up, that's a payoff!"

== Release ==
=== Home media ===
Up from the Depths was released on DVD by Shout Factory as a part of its "Roger Corman's Cult Classics" on January 18, 2011. Shout Factory later re-released the film on October 9, 2012.

== Reception ==
Kurt Dahlke from DVD Talk gave the film 1.5 out of 5 stars, criticizing the film's corny acting, uneven tone, and obvious rubber monster suit. Dahlke concluded his review by writing, "Up From The Depths isn't remotely scary or thrilling, it lacks sufficient violence or gore to please the punters, and its mid-course switch to comedy isn't all that funny either. We're talking about a real heap of bronze-plated crud, so if your taste runs to Z-movies, you'll still probably have to get real drunk to eke any pleasure out of this one." Charles Tatum from eFilmCritic gave the film 1/5 stars, panning the film's lack of characterizations, and suspense, as well as the film's special effects, and poor dubbing. R.L. Shafer from IGN called the film "severely lacking", and "a low-rent knock-off of Steven Spielberg's smash-hit, Jaws".

== Notes ==
- "New World's Monsters". Famous Monsters of Filmland (160 ed.). 1980. p. 12.
