= Plectromerus lingafelteri =

Scientific classification
- Domain: Eukaryota
- Kingdom: Animalia
- Phylum: Arthropoda
- Class: Insecta
- Order: Coleoptera
- Suborder: Polyphaga
- Infraorder: Cucujiformia
- Family: Cerambycidae
- Genus: Plectromerus
- Species: P. lingafelteri

Binomial name
- Plectromerus lingafelteri Micheli & Nearns, 2005

Species of beetle

Plectromerus lingafelteri is a species of beetle in the family Cerambycidae. It was described by Micheli and Nearns in 2005.
