= Howard Hesseman =

American actor (1940–2022)

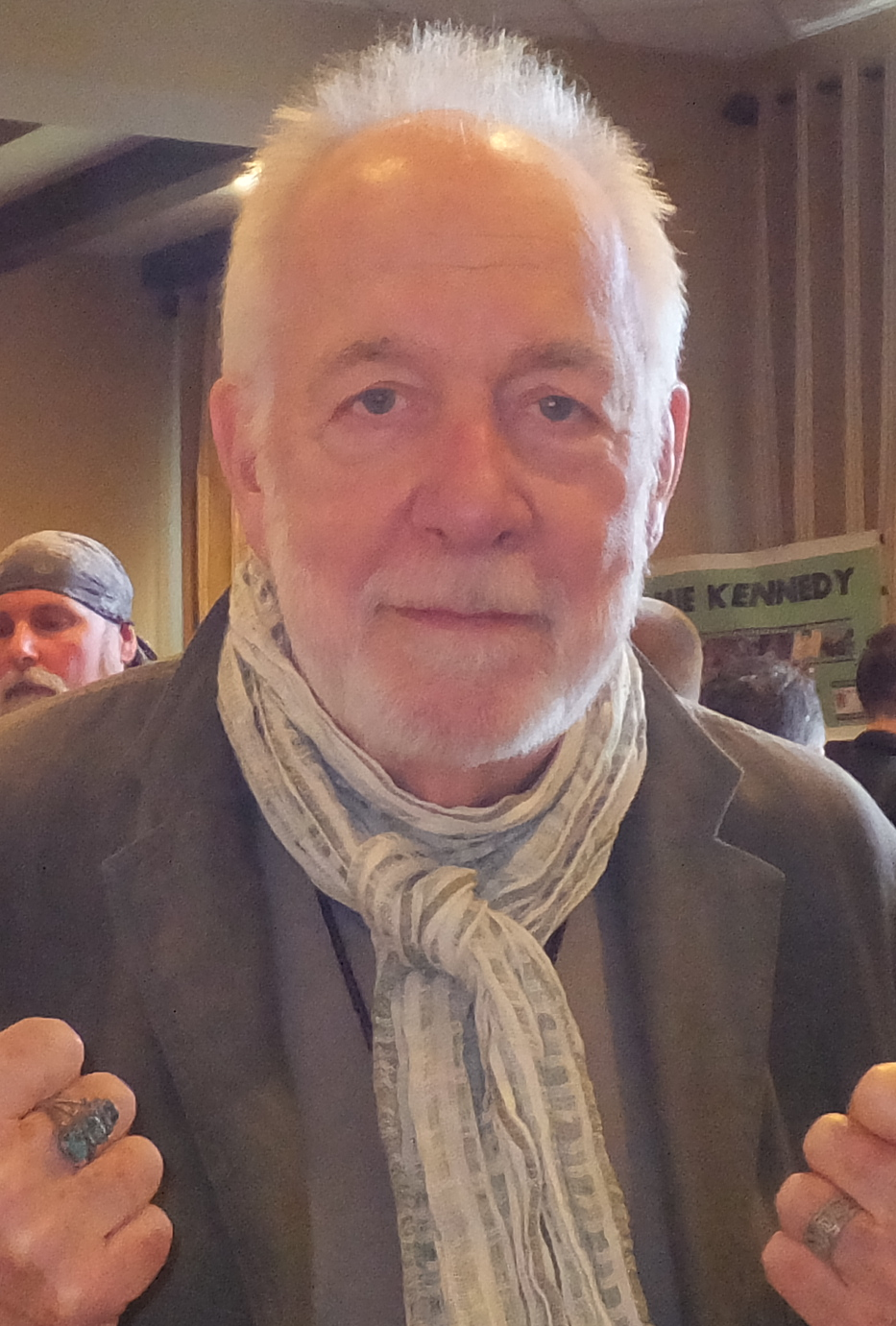
- Hesseman in 2014
- Born: February 27, 1940; Lebanon, Oregon, U.S.
- Died: January 29, 2022 (aged 81); Los Angeles, California, U.S.
- Education: University of Oregon
- Occupation: Actor
- Years active: 1968–2018
- Known for: WKRP in Cincinnati; Head of the Class
- Spouses: Cаtherine Mаison (m. 1965; div. 1974) Caroline Ducrocq (m. 1989)

Howard Hesseman (February 27, 1940 – January 29, 2022) was an American actor known for his television roles as burned-out disc jockey Dr. Johnny Fever on WKRP in Cincinnati (for which he earned two Emmy nominations for Outstanding Supporting Actor in a Comedy Series) and the lead role of history teacher Charlie Moore on Head of the Class. He appeared regularly on television and in film from the 1970s to 2010s, with his other noteworthy roles including Sam Royer (the husband of lead character Ann Romano) in the last two seasons of One Day at a Time and a supporting role as Captain Pete Lassard in the film Police Academy 2: Their First Assignment (1985).

== Early life ==
Hesseman was born in Lebanon, Oregon, on February 27, 1940. His parents divorced when he was five, and he was raised by his mother and stepfather, a police officer. He graduated from Silverton High School in 1958. Hesseman attended the University of Oregon, and was later a founding member of the San Francisco-based improvisational comedy troupe The Committee with fellow actor David Ogden Stiers. Early in his acting career, he used the alias Don Sturdy, the name he also used as a radio DJ on underground FM station KMPX in San Francisco in the late 1960s.

== Career ==
Under the alias of Don Sturdy, Hesseman made his first television appearances, including the episode "Public Affairs: DR-07" of the show Dragnet in 1968. He portrayed a hippie named Jesse Chaplin, the editor of an underground newspaper. In this Dragnet episode, his character was a panelist on a TV show opposite Sgt. Friday and Officer Gannon.

He played a bit part in two final-season episodes of The Andy Griffith Show. In the episode "Sam for Town Council", Hesseman played a character named Harry, who has an exchange with Emmett Clark (Paul Hartman), who is running for town council against Sam Jones, played by Ken Berry. Harry complains to Emmett how poor the fishing has been at a nearby fishing spot. Emmett promises to stock the pond with big perch in exchange for Harry's vote. Harry agrees and wears a campaign button supporting Emmett in the race. In the episode "Goober Goes to an Auto Show", Hesseman, also credited as Don Sturdy, played the counter boy, serving hot dogs and root beers to Goober and his old trade-school rival Roy Swanson, played by Noam Pitlik.

On July 18, 1969, he appeared with the improvisational comedy group The Committee in several sketches on The Dick Cavett Show, including one with guest Janis Joplin. Hesseman also appeared in a number of skits as part of The Committee in the 1971 classic film Billy Jack.

Hesseman made several appearances as Mr. Plager, a member of the group therapy ensemble on The Bob Newhart Show; Mr. Plager eventually came out as gay. Hesseman became a playwright in the sixth season of the show, writing a play about the characters in the group. In several other episodes of The Bob Newhart Show, Hesseman's voice can be heard as a TV announcer.

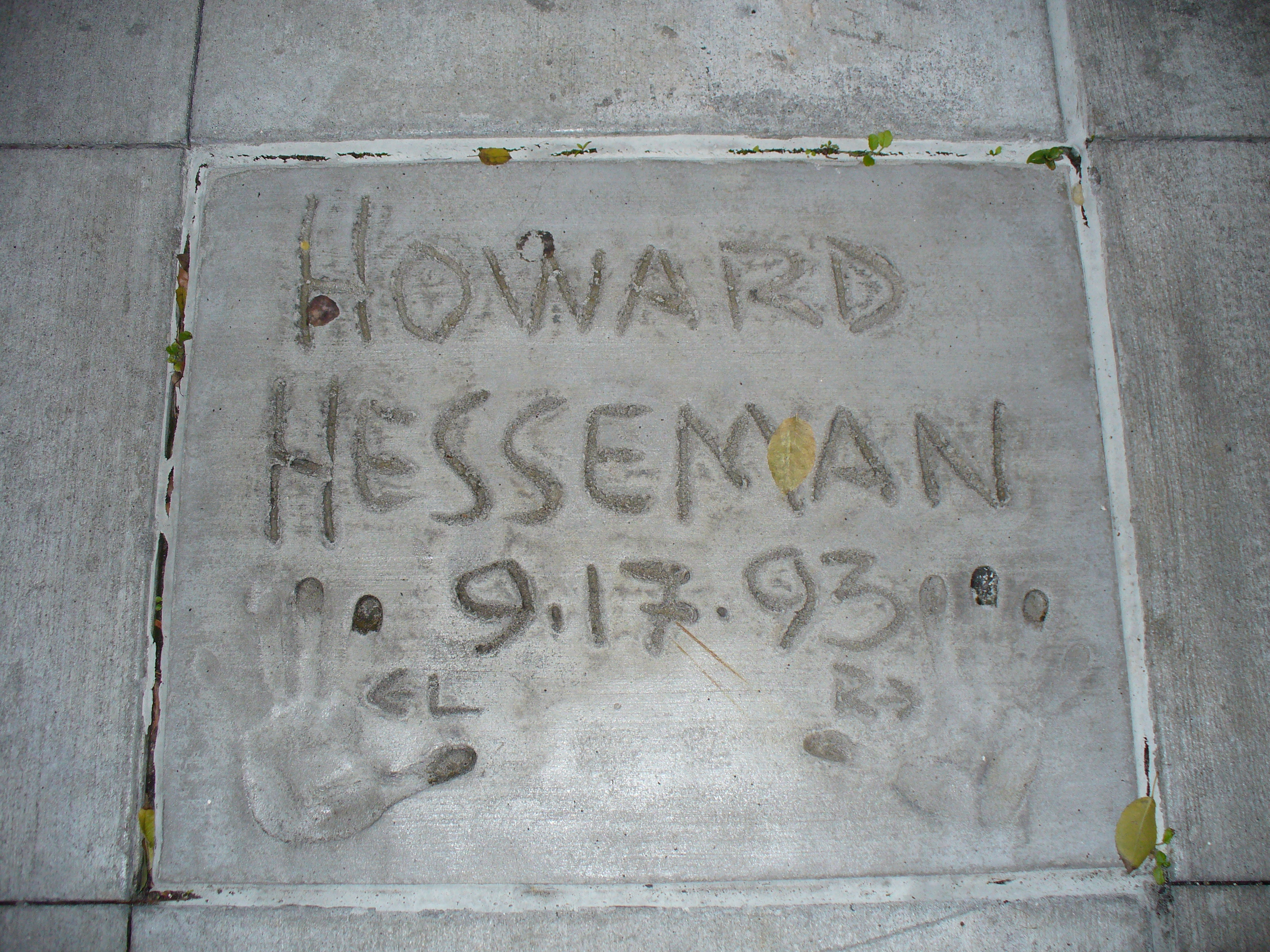
The handprints of Howard Hesseman in front of Hollywood Hills Amphitheater at Walt Disney World's Disney's Hollywood Studios theme park

Hesseman is best known for his role as DJ John "Dr. Johnny Fever" Caravella on the television sitcom WKRP in Cincinnati from 1978 to 1982, a role Hesseman prepared for by working as a DJ in San Francisco at KMPX-FM for several months. He was nominated for a Primetime Emmy Award for Outstanding Supporting Actor in a Comedy Series in 1980 and 1981 for his portrayal of Fever. He reprised the role in nine episodes of The New WKRP in Cincinnati, and also directed several episodes of that 1991-93 series revival.

Hesseman portrayed Sam Royer, the man who married Ann Romano (Bonnie Franklin) on the sitcom One Day at a Time from 1982 to 1984. He then played history teacher Charlie Moore on the ABC series Head of the Class for four seasons from 1986 to 1990. His film appearances included the comedy film Police Academy 2: Their First Assignment (1985) as Captain Pete Lassard, the mystery film Clue (1985) as the Chief of Police, and the Disney film Flight of the Navigator (1986) as NASA research facility scientist Dr. Louis Faraday.

Hesseman made three appearances on Saturday Night Live, one in which he paid tribute to, and told jokes about, the recently deceased John Belushi and the other in which NBC showed a picture of U.S. President Ronald Reagan, which Hesseman mooned off-camera. He also encouraged the viewing audience to moon the picture and send pictures in to NBC. In 1994, he introduced lost footage of Janis Joplin in a documentary on Woodstock. In 1995, Hesseman played the role of the Marquis de Sade in Quills at the Geffen Playhouse in Westwood, California, which included one scene in which he was fully naked. In 2001, Hesseman had a role on three episodes of That '70s Show. In 2002, he played Larry Hertzel in Alexander Payne's comedy-drama About Schmidt.

In 2006, Hesseman played the unorthodox Judge Robert Thompson in three episodes of Boston Legal, and also appeared in an episode of House. During his appearance as Judge Thompson, Hesseman paid homage to his role as a teacher in his earlier ABC series by hearing a court case while sitting atop the judge's bench, just as the character of Mr. Moore taught his class atop his desk. In 2007, he played The Chemist on HBO's John From Cincinnati. He guest-starred as an announcer at a horse track on Psych, in the episode "And Down the Stretch Comes Murder.” Hesseman guest-starred on the 2007 season premiere of NBC's ER, playing a man tripping on magic mushrooms who may or may not have been an orthopedist from another hospital. In 2009, he appeared in Rob Zombie's Halloween II and the Sandra Bullock film, All About Steve. Hesseman starred in The Sunshine Boys at the New Theatre Restaurant in Overland Park, Kansas, from September to November 2010. In February 2011, he portrayed Dr. Elliot D. Aden in the 11th-season CSI: Crime Scene Investigation episode "Turn On, Tune In, Drop Dead.” Dr. Aden was head of Department of Defense project called Stonewall at WLVU, which did research in fringe psychological concepts such as extrasensory perception and out-of-body experiences.

== Personal life and death ==
Hesseman was married to Kathy Mason from 1965 until 1974.

He was later married for 33 years to actress Caroline Ducrocq.

He died from complications of colorectal surgery in Los Angeles, California, on January 29, 2022, at age 81.

== Filmography ==
=== Film ===
| Year | Title | Role | Notes |
|---|---|---|---|
| 1968 | Petulia | Hippie | |
| 1969 | Some Kind of a Nut | The Bartender | Uncredited |
| 1971 | Billy Jack | Drama Teacher #2 | As Don Sturdy |
| 1971 | The Christian Licorice Store | Last Party Guest | |
| 1972 | Cisco Pike | Recording Engineer | As Don Sturdy |
| 1973 | Steelyard Blues | Frank Veldini | |
| 1973 | Jory | Santa Rosa Bartender | Uncredited |
| 1973 | Kid Blue | Confectionary Man | |
| 1975 | Shampoo | Red Dog | |
| 1975 | Prisoners | | |
| 1975 | Whiffs | Dr. Gopian | |
| 1975 | The Sunshine Boys | Mr. Walsh, Commercial Director | |
| 1976 | Tunnel Vision | Senator McMannus | |
| 1976 | Jackson County Jail | David | |
| 1976 | Silent Movie | Executive | |
| 1976 | The Big Bus | Jack | |
| 1977 | The Other Side of Midnight | O'Brien | |
| 1977 | Tarantulas: The Deadly Cargo | Fred | |
| 1978 | Loose Shoes | Ernie Piles | |
| 1979 | Americathon | Kip Margolis | |
| 1979 | The Jerk | Carnival Worker | Uncredited |
| 1981 | Private Lessons | Lester | |
| 1981 | Honky Tonk Freeway | Snapper | |
| 1983 | Doctor Detroit | "Smooth" Walker | |
| 1983 | Focus on Fishko | Sy | Short |
| 1984 | This Is Spinal Tap | Terry Ladd | |
| 1985 | Clue | The Chief | Uncredited |
| 1985 | Police Academy 2: Their First Assignment | Captain Pete Lassard | |
| 1986 | My Chauffeur | McBride | |
| 1986 | Flight of the Navigator | Dr. Louis Faraday | |
| 1986 | Inside Out | Jack | |
| 1986 | Heat | Pinchus Zion | |
| 1987 | Amazon Women on the Moon | Rupert King | Segment "Titan Man" |
| 1991 | Rubin and Ed | Ed Tuttle | |
| 1993 | Little Miss Millions | Nick Frost | |
| 1994 | Munchie Strikes Back | Munchie | Voice |
| 1995 | Out-of-Sync | Detective Caldwell | |
| 1996 | Boys' Night Out | Sheba / Mr. Cabot | Short |
| 1997 | Gridlock'd | Blind Man | |
| 1998 | The Way to Santiago | Johnson | Short |
| 1999 | The Sky Is Falling | Yogi Cook | |
| 2002 | Teddy Bears' Picnic | Ted Frye | |
| 2002 | The Mesmerist | Mr. Valdemar | |
| 2002 | About Schmidt | Larry Hertzel | |
| 2006 | Man About Town | Ben Giamoro | |
| 2006 | Domestic Import | Lou Kimmelman | |
| 2007 | Martian Child | Dr. Berg | |
| 2008 | The Rocker | "Gator" | |
| 2009 | Halloween II | "Uncle Meat" | |
| 2009 | All About Steve | Mr. Horowitz | |
| 2012 | Bigfoot | Mayor Tommy Gillis | |
| 2012 | A Helping Hand | Howard | Short |
| 2016 | Wild Oats | Vespucci | |
| 2016 | Silver Skies | Billy | |
| 2016 | Emmett in Peopleland | Howard Oozman | Short |
| 2018 | Dirty Politics | "Big Oil" | |

=== Television ===
| Year | Title | Role | Notes |
|---|---|---|---|
| 1968 | The Andy Griffith Show | Hot Dog Vendor | Episode: "Goober Goes to an Auto Show" |
| 1968 | Dragnet 1969 | Jesse Chaplin (as Don Sturdy) | Episode: "Public Affairs: DR-07" |
| 1971 | The Feminist and the Fuzz | Hippie | TV movie (uncredited) |
| 1973 | The Blue Knight | | TV movie |
| 1974 | Firehouse | Hanley | Episode: "The Hottest Place in Town" |
| 1974 | Another April | Dennis Webber | TV movie |
| 1974 | Rhoda | Kirk Stevens | Episode: "I'll Be Loving You, Sometimes" |
| 1975 | Mannix | Ray Bennett | Episode: "A Ransom for Yesterday" |
| 1975 | Hustling | Detective | TV movie |
| 1975 | Sanford and Son | Professor Stoneham | Episode: "The Family Man" |
| 1975 | The Blue Knight | Resident | Episode: "Pilot" |
| 1975 | Harry O | Senator Lawler | Episode: "Tender Killing Care" |
| 1976 | Collision Course: Truman vs. MacArthur | AP Man | TV movie |
| 1976 | Family | Store Manager | Episode: "A Special Kind of Loving" |
| 1976 | Switch | M.W. | Episode: "Pirates of Tin Pan Alley" |
| 1976 | Baretta | Walker | Episode: "Street Edition" |
| 1976 | Laverne & Shirley | Dr. Grayson | Episode: "Oh Hear the Angels' Voices" |
| 1976–1977 | Mary Hartman, Mary Hartman | Dr. Robert Williams | 13 episodes |
| 1977 | Delvecchio | "Goldie" | Episode: "Dying Can Be a Pleasure" |
| 1977 | Tail Gunner Joe | Lieutenant Ted Cantwell | TV movie |
| 1977 | Westside Medical | "Buzz" Canfield | Episode: "The Witch of Four West" |
| 1977 | The Amazing Howard Hughes | Jenks | TV movie |
| 1977 | The TVTV Show | Ralph Buckler | TV movie |
| 1977 | Blansky's Beauties | Dr. Berg | Episode: "Nancy Breaks a Leg" |
| 1977 | Quincy, M.E. | District Attorney Jerry Douglas | Episode: "A Dead Man's Truth" |
| 1977 | Tarantulas: The Deadly Cargo | Fred | TV movie |
| 1974–1978 | The Bob Newhart Show | Craig Plager / Augie | 6 episodes |
| 1978 | The Ghost of Flight 401 | Bert Stockwell | TV movie |
| 1978 | The Rockford Files | Al Steever | Episode: "The House on Willis Avenue" |
| 1978 | Husbands, Wives & Lovers | Dave | Episode: "Ron Moves in and Helene Steps Out" |
| 1978 | Soap | Mr. Franklin | 7 episodes |
| 1978 | The Comedy Company | Roger Dustleman | TV movie |
| 1978 | More Than Friends | Avery Salminella | TV movie |
| 1978 | Outside Chance | David | TV movie |
| 1978–1982 | WKRP in Cincinnati | Dr. Johnny Fever | 86 episodes |
| 1979 | You Can't Take It with You | Wilbur C. Henderson | TV movie |
| 1980 | Gridlock | Senor Smooth (voice) | TV movie |
| 1980 | Skyward | Koup Trenton | TV movie |
| 1982 | Victims | Charles Galloway | TV movie |
| 1982 | One Shoe Makes It Murder | Joe Hervey | TV movie |
| 1982 | 9 to 5 | | Episode: "Home Is Where the Hart Is" |
| 1983 | Love, Sidney | Earl Edwards | Episode: "The Shrink" |
| 1983 | Likely Stories, Vol. 4 | Seymour Z. Fishko | TV movie |
| 1982–1984 | One Day at a Time | Sam Royer | 16 episodes |
| 1984 | Mister Roberts | Doc | TV movie |
| 1984 | Best Kept Secrets | Jim Osborne | TV movie |
| 1984 | Silence of the Heart | Carl Lewis | TV movie |
| 1985 | George Burns Comedy Week | | Episode: "The Honeybunnies" |
| 1985 | Murder, She Wrote | Sheldon Greenberg | Episode: "Widow, Weep for Me" |
| 1986 | Faerie Tale Theatre | King | Episode: "The Princess Who Had Never Laughed" |
| 1987 | Six Against the Rock | Joseph "Dutch" Cretzer | TV movie |
| 1988 | The Diamond Trap | Detective Rollings | TV movie |
| 1986–1990 | Head of the Class | Charlie Moore | 96 episodes |
| 1990 | Call Me Anna | John Ross | TV movie |
| 1991 | Murder in New Hampshire: The Pamela Wojas Smart Story | Paul Maggioto | TV movie |
| 1992 | Black Death | Calvin Phillips | TV movie |
| 1992 | The Ray Bradbury Theatre | Bayes | Episode: "Downwind from Gettysburg" |
| 1992 | Hot Chocolate | Mr. Cassidy | TV movie |
| 1991–1993 | The New WKRP in Cincinnati | Dr. Johnny Fever | 10 episodes |
| 1993 | Lethal Exposure | Taylor | TV movie |
| 1995 | Burke's Law | Chuck Mason | Episode: "Who Killed the Gadget Man?" |
| 1996 | Innocent Victims | Smithline | TV movie |
| 1997 | The Outer Limits | Dr. Emory Taylor | Episode: "Music of the Spheres" |
| 1997 | High Stakes | Wayne Dreyer | TV movie |
| 1997 | On the 2nd Day of Christmas | David | TV movie |
| 1998 | Two Guys and a Girl | Mr. Bergen | Episode: "Two Guys, a Girl and a Dad" |
| 1999 | The Practice | Judge C. Williams | Episode: "A Day in the Life" |
| 1999 | Tracey Takes On... | Todd | Episode: "Drugs" |
| 1999 | Family Law | Howard Thomas / Randall | Episode: "The Fourth Trimester" |
| 1999 | The Pretender | Landlord | Episode: "Extreme" |
| 2000 | Touched by an Angel | Flynn Hodge | Episode: "Monica's Bad Day" |
| 2001 | Level 9 | General Richard Scheffer | Episode: "Wetware" |
| 2001 | Three Sisters | Jerry Keats | Episode: "The In-Laws" |
| 2001 | That '70s Show | Max | 3 episodes |
| 2001 | Thieves | Hal Bloomberg | Episode: "Jack's Back" |
| 2001 | Crossing Jordan | Barney Reynolds | Episode: "Sight Unseen" |
| 2002 | Maybe It's Me | Mr. Finn | Episode: "The Crazy-Girl Episode" |
| 2003 | It's All Relative | Monty | Episode: "Road Trippin'" |
| 2003 | Boomtown | Mel Castle | Episode: "The Big Picture" |
| 2004 | Oliver Beene | Dr. Fenniger | Episode: "Superhero" |
| 2005 | Crazy for Christmas | Fred Nickells | TV movie |
| 2006 | House | Henry Errington | Episode: "Sex Kills" |
| 2006–2007 | Boston Legal | Judge Robert Thompson | 3 episodes |
| 2007 | Psych | Barry Saunder | Episode: "And Down the Stretch Comes Murder" |
| 2007 | John from Cincinnati | Erlemeyer | 2 episodes |
| 2007 | ER | Dr. James Broderick | Episode: "The War Comes Home" |
| 2010 | Lie to Me | Sam Hendricks | Episode: "Beat the Devil" |
| 2011 | CSI: Crime Scene Investigation | Dr. Aden | Episode: "Turn On, Tune In, Drop Dead" |
| 2011 | Drop Dead Diva | Cole Lamburt | Episode: "The Wedding" |
| 2012 | Mike & Molly | Otis | Episode: "Mike Likes Lasagna" |
| 2013 | HitStreak | | |
| 2015 | The Homeless Detective | Howard Oozman | TV movie |
| 2016 | Chicago Med | Clyde Glickman | Episode: "Withdrawal" |
| 2016 | A Christmas in Vermont | Nick Harper | TV movie |
| 2017 | Fresh Off the Boat | Mr. Royce | 2 episodes |
