= Giesbertia =

Giesbertia rugosa

Scientific classification
- Kingdom: Animalia
- Phylum: Arthropoda
- Class: Insecta
- Order: Coleoptera
- Suborder: Polyphaga
- Infraorder: Cucujiformia
- Family: Cerambycidae
- Genus: Giesbertia
- Species: G. rugosa

Binomial name
- Giesbertia rugosa Chemsak & Linsley, 1984

Genus of beetles

Giesbertia rugosa is a species of beetle in the family Cerambycidae, the only species in the genus Giesbertia.
