= Giesbertella =

Giesbertella mimetica

Scientific classification
- Kingdom: Animalia
- Phylum: Arthropoda
- Class: Insecta
- Order: Coleoptera
- Suborder: Polyphaga
- Infraorder: Cucujiformia
- Family: Cerambycidae
- Genus: Giesbertella
- Species: G. mimetica

Binomial name
- Giesbertella mimetica Chemsak & Hovore, in Eya, 2010

Genus of beetles

Giesbertella mimetica is a species of beetle in the family Cerambycidae, the only species in the genus Giesbertella.
