= Jackson County Jail (film) =

1976 Michael Miller film

- Theatrical release poster
- Directed by: Michael Miller
- Written by: Donald E. Stewart
- Produced by: Jeff Begun
- Starring: Yvette Mimieux; Tommy Lee Jones; Robert Carradine; Nancy Noble; Severn Darden; Mary Woronov
- Cinematography: Bruce Logan
- Edited by: Caroline Biggerstaff
- Music by: L. Loren Newkirk
- Production company: New World Pictures
- Distributed by: New World Pictures (U.S.); United Artists (overseas)
- Release date: April 11, 1976
- Running time: 84 minutes
- Country: United States
- Language: English
- Budget: $500,000
- Box office: $2.3 million (rentals)

Jackson County Jail is a 1976 American crime drama film directed by Michael Miller, and starring Yvette Mimieux, Tommy Lee Jones and Robert Carradine.

== Plot ==
Dinah Hunter is an advertising executive living in Los Angeles who quits her job after arguing with client Mr. Bigelow and comes home to find her boyfriend David in the swimming pool with another woman, Candy. Sick of his constant philandering, she calls her friend Allison and gets her old job back in New York City. Driving cross-country from Los Angeles, Dinah picks up a young man, named Bobby Ray, and his pregnant girlfriend Lola. That night, Bobby Ray and Lola pull a gun on Dinah, stealing her car and purse. Dinah walks into an empty bar and asks Dan Oldum, the bartender, to use his phone to call the police to report the robbery, but the barman gets drunk and attempts to rape her, and after she defends herself, a sheriff's deputy, Burt, arrives and Oldum lies by telling him that Dinah attacked him. With no money or identification on her, the deputy believes Oldum and arrests Dinah and takes her to the Jackson County jail.

The next day, Dinah is in a jail cell next to Coley Blake, a Texas drifter whom she witnessed getting arrested earlier after a car accident. Sheriff Dempsey explains to Dinah that until he can get through to Los Angeles or New York to verify her identity, she has to stay in jail. He then tells Blake that he is to be extradited to Laredo, Texas for a murder charge. That evening, the night jailer, Deputy Hobie, assaults Dinah in her cell and rapes her. After he finishes, she grabs a wooden stool and beats him to death. Blake reaches through the bars and takes his keys, opens both cells, and drags Dinah outside to steal Hobie's pickup truck. Sheriff Dempsey witnesses them escaping and gives chase only to run head-on into another car driven by a drunk driver resulting in the deaths of both the sheriff and the other driver.

Blake takes Dinah to a farm out in the hills to hide out where he meets up with some friends who let Dinah clean up and give her a change of clothes. As Blake and Dinah are leaving, Officer Jessie and Officer Blake, two officers from the Bakersfield police, show up and tell everybody to surrender. Blake's friends pull out machine guns and hold off the police while Blake and Dinah escape in the pickup truck.

After driving through pastures and dirt roads, they find an empty ranch house to hide in for the night. Listening to the news, they discover that they are both wanted for Hobie's death. Dinah wants to turn herself in, but Blake explains that it does not matter that she was raped; she killed a cop and that with both her rapist and Sheriff Dempsey dead and unable to corroborate her self-defense story, she will be arrested and not receive a fair trial for Blake claims that all small town police are corrupt and will see her put away for life or given the death penalty. He says that, since she doesn't have a criminal record, she could just live the rest of her life as a fugitive, pointing out that her life as she knows it is already over and that no policeman will ever believe her side of the story due to the circumstances.

The next morning, they are awakened by Sam Hayes, the shotgun-carrying owner of the ranch. Blake knocks the shotgun out of Sam's hand and the two crash through a window. During the fight, Sam wounds Blake with a scythe and is about to kill him when Dinah puts a gun to the Sam's head and knocks him out. Blake and Dinah jump into the pickup with Dinah driving. A police helicopter spots them and radios the Fallsburg police who are all at a Bicentennial parade.

The Fallsburg police chief orders his men to make a roadblock using a tractor-trailer. Dinah drives right into the trap and the police open fire, hitting Dinah in the shoulder. Blake tries to help Dinah to escape on foot, but she is too badly wounded. Blake leaves Dinah behind while he and the police exchange gunfire as he runs through the town and into the parade. The police fatally gun him down as he knocks over a standard bearer and Blake dies lying on the American flag. The police chief drives up with the wounded Dinah in the back seat and she stares at Blake's dead body before he drives away to take her to the town's jail.

== Cast ==
- Yvette Mimieux as Dinah Hunter
- Tommy Lee Jones as Coley Blake
- Robert Carradine as Bobby Ray
- Nancy Noble as Lola
- Severn Darden as Sheriff Dempsey
- Mary Woronov as Pearl
- Fredric Cook as Deputy Hobie
- Howard Hesseman as David
- John Lawlor as Deputy Burt
- Britt Leach as Dan Oldum
- Nan Martin as Allison
- Cliff Emmich as Mr. Bigelow
- Marciee Drake as Candy
- Richard Lockmiller as Officer Jessie
- Jack O'Leary as Officer Blake
- Duffy Hambleton as Sam Hayes
- Hal Needham as Police Chief
- Ira Miller as Drunk Man

== Production notes ==
The film is one of several so-called "drive-in" films that were presented as true stories when most, if not all, of what was portrayed on screen was outright fiction. Other examples include 1972's The Legend of Boggy Creek, 1974's The Texas Chain Saw Massacre, 1975's Macon County Line, and 1976's The Town That Dreaded Sundown.

== Response ==
Kevin Thomas of The Los Angeles Times wrote that the film "reflects the American psyche more extensively and more accurately than many a higher-budgeted 'serious' picture."

Jackson County Jail has become a cult film. In 1996, it was selected by film director Quentin Tarantino for the first Quentin Tarantino Film Festival in Austin, Texas.

Based on CBS' positive response to airing Jackson County Jail in prime time, Miller pitched the network on an alternate storyline for Mimieux's character, envisioning a potential series for her in the vein of The Fugitive. The network greenlit this new pilot film, Outside Chance, which contained 30 minutes of footage from the original, blended with newly shot material with Mimieux and some other actors from the previous film; Tommy Lee Jones' scenes were removed, though his character Coley Blake was still referenced. The film premiered on the network on Saturday, December 2, 1978. The pilot did not go to series.

Film critic Danny Peary lists the film as one of his "Must See" Films in his Guide for the Film Fanatic (1986).

The film was remade in 1997 as Macon County Jail starring Ally Sheedy and David Carradine.
