= Loose Shoes =

1980 film

- Theatrical release poster
- Directed by: Ira Miller
- Written by: Varley Smith; Ian Praiser; Ira Miller; Royce D. Applegate
- Produced by: Joel Chernoff
- Starring: Bill Murray; Howard Hesseman; Jaye P. Morgan; Buddy Hackett; Avery Schreiber; Ed Lauter; David Landsberg; Misty Rowe; Susan Tyrrell
- Cinematography: Jack Beckett
- Edited by: Alan Balsam
- Music by: Murphy Dunne
- Production company: Brooksfilms
- Distributed by: Atlantic Entertainment Group
- Release dates: September 1, 1978 (United States); August 1, 1980 (re-release)
- Running time: 84 minutes
- Country: United States
- Language: English

Loose Shoes (also known as Coming Attractions and Quackers) is a 1978 sketch comedy film directed by Ira Miller and featuring Bill Murray. The film is presented as a series of movie trailers with titles such as The Howard Huge Story, Skate-boarders from Hell, and The Invasion of the Penis Snatchers.

The film was originally released on September 1, 1978, as Coming Attractions and promoted with the tagline "The Movie That Makes Fun of the Movies". It was re-released in 1980 under the title of Loose Shoes, capitalizing on the increased fame of Murray (Saturday Night Live, Meatballs) and Howard Hesseman (WKRP in Cincinnati).

The updated title is taken from a 1940s Cab Calloway-style song-and-dance number in the film's final skit, "Dark Town After Dark", which satirizes an infamous 1976 drunken, racist remark made by Gerald Ford's then-Secretary of Agriculture Earl Butz (who was subsequently forced to resign) on a plane: "I'll tell you what the coloreds want. It's three things: first, a tight pussy; second, loose shoes; and third, a warm place to shit".

== Cast ==
- Royce D. Applegate as Delmus
- Bill Murray as "Lefty" Schwartz
- Lewis Arquette as Warden
- Howard Hesseman as Ernie Piles, War Correspondent
- Dan McBride as Private Pyle
- Misty Rowe as Louise
- David Landsberg as Duddy Allen
- Brad Ashcraft as Raygoon Gasbar
- Dustin Day as “The Darknipple”
- Alexander Stowe as “Shame of Krakow”
- Avery Schreiber as Theater Manager
- Susan Tyrrell as "Boobies"
- Ed Lauter as Sheriff Bob
- Tom Baker as Billy "Jerk"
- Buddy Hackett as Himself, S.T.O.P.-I.T. Spokesman
- Sean Frye as Bobby, The S.T.O.P.-I.T. Poster Boy
- Jaye P. Morgan as S.T.O.P.-I.T. Nurse
- Sandy Helberg as Biker Eulogist
- Betty Thomas as Biker Chick
- Mark Volman as Biker
- Rod McCary as Clark
- Sid Haig as Lone Stranger
- Van Dyke Parks as Indian #2
- Larry Hankin as 2nd Veteran
- David Downing as 'Loose Shoes' Singer
- Kinky Friedman as Prisoner
- Harry Shearer as The Narrator of "Dark Town After Dark"
