= Felicia Atkins =

Australian model (1937–2016)

Playboy centerfold appearance
- April 1958
- Preceded by: Zahra Norbo
- Succeeded by: Lari Laine

Personal details
- Born: 5 April 1937 Australia
- Died: 8 December 2016 (aged 79) New South Wales, Australia
- Height: 5 ft 8 in (1.73 m)

Felicia Atkins (5 April 1937 – 8 December 2016) was an Australian model. She was Playboy magazine's Playmate of the Month for the April, 1958 issue. Her centerfold was photographed by Bruno Bernard and Bill Bridges.

Felicia Atkins was a showgirl at the Tropicana Resort & Casino in Las Vegas, in their Las Vegas rendition of the "Folies Bergère", which is how she was discovered by Playboy. (The Playboy issue Atkins was featured in had a Las Vegas, Nevada theme.) Atkins holds the record for the longest tenure in the Tropicana's long-running Folies-Bergère revue (19 years). She was the maid of honor at the marriage of Phillip Crosby, son of Bing Crosby, to fellow Tropicana showgirl Sandra Drummond, whilst she was dating Phillip's brother Gary Crosby.

Atkins died on 8 December 2016, at the age of 79.

== See also ==
- List of people in Playboy 1953–1959

Elizabeth Ann Roberts	Cheryl Kubert	Zahra Norbo	Felicia Atkins	Lari Laine	Judy Lee Tomerlin
Linné Ahlstrand	Myrna Weber	Teri Hope	Mara Corday, Pat Sheehan	Joan Staley	Joyce Nizzari
