= 8th Youth in Film Awards =

1986 US media awards ceremony

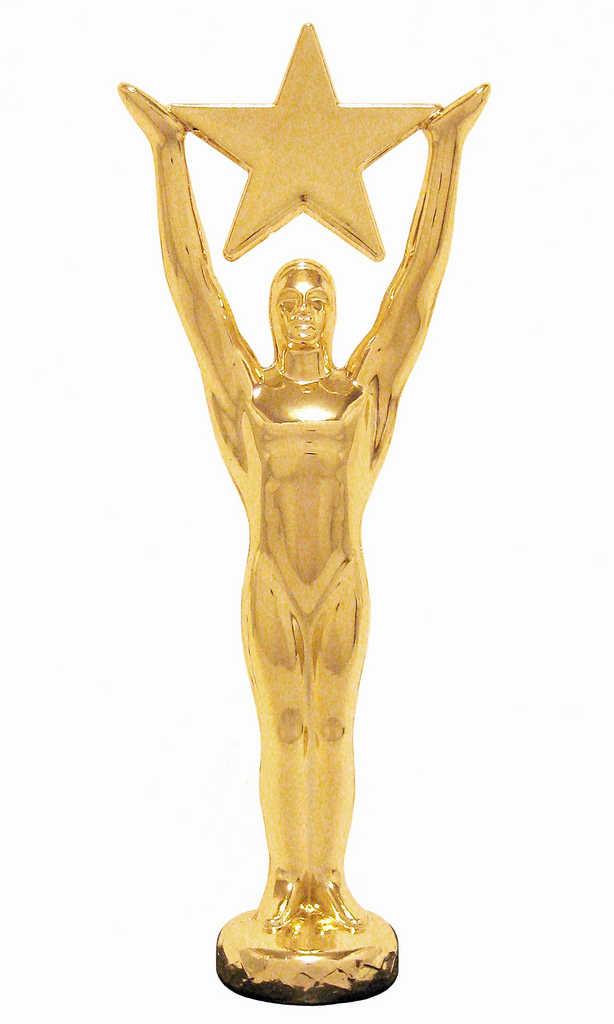
- Awarded for: Achievement in the 1985—1986 season
- Date: November 22, 1986
- Site: Coconut Grove; Ambassador Hotel; Los Angeles, California
- Hosted by: Fred Savage and Alyssa Milano

The 8th Youth in Film Awards ceremony (now known as the Young Artist Awards), presented by the Youth in Film Association, honored outstanding youth performers under the age of 21 in the fields of film, television and music for the 1985–1986 season, and took place on November 22, 1986, at the Ambassador Hotel's historical Coconut Grove night club in Los Angeles, California.

Established in 1978 by long-standing Hollywood Foreign Press Association member, Maureen Dragone, the Youth in Film Association was the first organization to establish an awards ceremony specifically set to recognize and award the contributions of performers under the age of 18 in the fields of film, television, theater and music.

== Categories ==
★ Bold indicates the winner in each category.

== Best Young Performer in a Feature Film ==
=== Exceptional Performance by a Young Actor Starring in a Feature Film – Comedy or Drama ===
★ Corey Haim – Lucas (20th Century Fox)

- Chad Allen – TerrorVision (Empire Pictures)
- Brandon Douglas – Papa Was a Preacher (LaRose Productions)
- Scott Grimes – Critters (New Line Cinema)
- Peter Billingsley – The Dirt Bike Kid (Trinity Pictures)
- Bobby Jacoby – The Zoo Gang (New World Pictures)

=== Exceptional Performance by a Young Actress Starring in a Feature Film – Comedy or Drama ===
★ Laura Jacoby – Rad (Tri-Star)

- Lucy Deakins – The Boy Who Could Fly (20th Century Fox)
- Kerri Green – Lucas (20th Century Fox)
- Elisabeth Harnois – One Magic Christmas (Disney)
- Melora Hardin – Papa Was a Preacher (LaRose Productions)
- Robyn Lively – Wildcats (Warner Bros)
- Alyssa Milano – Commando (20th Century Fox)
- Heather O'Rourke – Poltergeist II: The Other Side (M.G.M.)

=== Exceptional Performance by a Young Actor in a Supporting Role in a Feature Film: Comedy, Fantasy, or Drama ===
★ Fred Savage – The Boy Who Could Fly (20th Century Fox)

- David Bennent – Legend (Universal)
- Brandon Call – Jagged Edge (Columbia)
- E'Lon Cox – Jo Jo Dancer, Your Life Is Calling (Columbia)
- Bumper Robinson – Enemy Mine (20th Century Fox)

=== Exceptional Performance by a Young Actress in a Supporting Role in a Feature Film: Comedy, Fantasy, or Drama ===
★ Gennie James – Papa Was a Preacher (LaRose Productions)

- Jenny Beck – Troll (Empire Films)
- Carrie Henn – Aliens (20th Century Fox)
- Cynthia Nixon – The Manhattan Project (20th Century Fox)
- Natalie Roth – The Delta Force (Cannon Film Distributors)

== Best Young Performer in a TV Special or Movie of the Week ==
=== Exceptional Performance by a Young Actor Starring in a TV Special or Movie of the Week ===
★ Corey Haim – A Time to Live (NBC)

- Brandon Douglas – The Children of Times Square (ABC)
- David Faustino – Mr. Boogedy (Disney)
- Huckleberry Fox – PBS WonderWorks – Konrad (Wonderworks/PBS)
- David Greenlee – CBS Schoolbreak Special – God, The Universe, and Hot Fudge Sundaes (CBS)
- Chris Hebert – Fuzz Bucket (Disney)
- Chad Sheets – PBS WonderWorks – The Lone Star Kid (Wonderworks/PBS)

=== Exceptional Performance by a Young Actress Starring in a TV Special or Movie of the Week ===
★ Roxana Zal – CBS Schoolbreak Special – God, The Universe, and Hot Fudge Sundaes (CBS)

- Tina Caspary – News at Eleven (CBS)
- Christa Denton – News at Eleven (CBS)
- Natalie Gregory – Alice in Wonderland (CBS)
- Virginia Keehne – Casebusters (ABC)
- Jenny Lewis – Convicted (ABC)
- Shawnee Smith – Crime of Innocence (NBC)
- Kristy Swanson – Mr. Boogedy (Disney)

=== Exceptional Performance by a Young Actor in a Supporting Role: TV Series, TV Special or Movie of the Week ===
★ Taliesin Jaffe – Child's Cry (CBS)

- Joey Lawrence – ABC Afterschool Special – Don't Touch (ABC)
- Gregory "Mars" Martin – The Children of Times Square (ABC)
- Danny Nucci – The Children of Times Square (ABC)
- Carl Steven – Crossings (ABC)
- Scott Schwartz – A Time to Live (NBC)

=== Exceptional Performance by a Young Actress in a Supporting Role: TV Series, TV Special or Movie of the Week ===
★ Melanie Gaffin – CBS Schoolbreak Special – God, The Universe, and Hot Fudge Sundaes (CBS)

- Heather Haase – PBS WonderWorks – Maricela (Wonderworks/PBS)
- Gennie James – |Alex: The Life of a Child (ABC)
- Marissa Mendenhall – Walt Disney's Wonderful World of Color – 2 1/2 Dads (Disney)
- Lisa Marie Simmon – PBS WonderWorks – Maricela (Wonderworks/PBS)

== Best Young Performer in a TV Series: Comedy or Drama ==
=== Exceptional Performance by a Young Actor In a Long Running Series: Comedy or Drama ===
★ Danny Pintauro – Who's The Boss? (ABC)

- Peter Costa – The Cosby Show (NBC)
- Joshua Harris – Dallas (CBS)
- Jason Hervey – Diff'rent Strokes (ABC)
- Omri Katz – Dallas (CBS)
- Steve Shaw – Knots Landing (CBS)
- Jeremy Miller – Growing Pains (ABC)

=== Exceptional Performance by a Young Actress in a Long Running Series: Comedy or Drama ===
★ Emily Schulman – Small Wonder (Metromedia KTTV)

- Tonya Crowe – Knots Landing (CBS)
- Ami Foster – Punky Brewster (NBC)
- Lauri Hendler – Gimme a Break! (NBC)
- Cherie Johnson – Punky Brewster (NBC)
- Regina King – 227 (NBC)
- Lara Jill Miller – Gimme a Break! (NBC)

=== Exceptional Performance by a Young Actor Starring in a Television Comedy or Drama Series ===
★ Kirk Cameron – Growing Pains (ABC)

- Brice Beckham – Mr. Belvedere (ABC)
- Danny Cooksey – Diff'rent Strokes (ABC)
- Frederick Koehler – Kate & Allie (CBS)
- Joey Lawrence – Gimme a Break! (NBC)
- Emmanuel Lewis – Webster (ABC)
- Alfonso Ribeiro – Silver Spoons (NBC)
- Jerry Supiran – Small Wonder (Metromedia KTTV)

=== Exceptional Performance by a Young Actress Starring in a Television Comedy or Drama Series ===
★ Alyssa Milano – Who's the Boss? (ABC)

- Tempestt Bledsoe – The Cosby Show (NBC)
- Tiffany Brissette – Small Wonder (Metromedia KTTV)
- Keshia Knight Pulliam – The Cosby Show (NBC)
- Ari Meyers – Kate & Allie (CBS)
- Allison Smith – Kate & Allie (CBS)
- Tracy Wells – Mr. Belvedere (ABC)

=== Exceptional Performance by a Young Actor in a New Television Comedy or Drama Series ===
★ Ke Huy Quan – Together We Stand (CBS)

- Chad Allen – Our House (NBC)
- Gabriel Damon – One Big Family (Witt/Thomas Productions)
- Andre Gower – "Fathers and Sons" (NBC)
- Benji Gregory – ALF (NBC)
- Scott Grimes – Together We Stand (CBS)
- Jeremy Licht – Valerie (NBC)
- Danny Ponce – Valerie (NBC)
- Ernie Reyes, Jr. – Sidekicks (Disney)
- Jonathan Ward – Heart of the City (CBS)

=== Exceptional Performance by a Young Actress in a New Television Comedy or Drama Series ===
★ Christina Applegate – Heart of the City (ABC)

- Natasha Bobo – Together We Stand (CBS)
- Shannen Doherty – Our House (NBC)
- Andrea Elson – ALF (NBC)
- Khrystyne Haje – Head of the Class (ABC)
- Keri Houlihan – Our House (NBC)
- Alison McMillan – One Big Family (Witt/Thomas Productions)
- Megan Mullally – The Ellen Burstyn Show (ABC)
- Katie O'Neill – Together We Stand (CBS)
- Tannis Vallely – Head of the Class (ABC)

=== Exceptional Performance by a Young Actor Guest Starring in a Television Series: Comedy or Drama ===
★ Billy Jacoby – The Golden Girls (NBC)

- Phillip Boutte – Family Ties (NBC)
- Adam Carl – Family Ties (NBC)
- Danny Capri – Hardesty House (ABC)
- Curtis Baldwin – 227 (NBC)
- Roland Harrah III – Airwolf (CBS)
- Bobby Jacoby – Diff'rent Strokes (ABC)
- Chris Hebert – The Twilight Zone (CBS)
- Scooter Stevens – Tales from the Dark Side (KTLA)
- Jacob Vargas – Hunter (NBC)

=== Exceptional Performance by a Young Actress Guest Starring in a Television Series: Comedy or Drama ===
★ Alyson Croft – Highway to Heaven (NBC)

- Tonya Crowe – Who's the Boss? (ABC)
- Nicole Eggert – Who's the Boss? (ABC)
- Tanya Fenmore – Tales from the Dark Side (KTLA)
- Laura Jacoby – Punky Brewster (NBC)
- Angela Lee – Who's the Boss? (ABC)
- April Lerman – Growing Pains (ABC)
- Amy Lynne – New Love, American Style (ABC)
- Julie St. Claire – The Judge (KCLA)
- Stefanie Ridel – Punky Brewster (NBC)

== Best Young Performer in a Daytime Series ==
=== Exceptional Performance by a Young Actor in a Daytime Series ===
★ Brandon Call – Santa Barbara (NBC)

- Thom Bierdz – The Young and the Restless (CBS)
- Danny Gellis – Capitol (CBS)
- Jamie McEnnan – The Young and the Restless (CBS)
- David Mendenhall – General Hospital (ABC)

=== Exceptional Performance by a Young Actress in a Daytime Series ===
★ Kimberly McCullough – General Hospital (ABC)

- Lauralee Bell – The Young and the Restless (CBS)
- Melissa Brennan – Days of Our Lives (NBC)
- Christie Clark – Days of Our Lives (NBC)
- Kelly Hyman – The Young and the Restless (CBS)

== Best Young Performer in a Cable Series or Special ==
=== Exceptional Performance by a Young Actor/Actress in a Cable Series or Cable Special ===
★ Scott Nemes – It's Garry Shandling's Show (Showtime)

- Sheryl Giffis – A Time to Tell (Disney)
- Randy Josselyn – Down to Earth (WTBS)
- Georg Olden – Rocky Road (WTBS)

== Best Young Performer in Animation ==
=== Exceptional Performance by a Young Actor in Animation: TV Series, TV Special, or Film Feature ===
★ David Mendenhall – Rainbow Brite and the Star Stealer (Warner Bros)

- Chad Allen – Happy New Year, Charlie Brown! (Lee Mendelson/Bill Melendez Productions)
- Josh Rodine – The Berenstain Bears (Hanna-Barbera/Southern Star Productions)
- Jeremy Reinbolt – You're a Good Man, Charlie Brown (Lee Mendelson/Bill Melendez Productions)
- Brennan Thicke – M.A.S.K. (DIC Enterprises)
- R. J. Williams – Kissyfur (DIC Enterprises)
- David Mendenhall – The Transformers: The Movie (Marvel Productions)

=== Exceptional Performance by a Young Actress in Animation: TV Series, TV Special, or Film Feature ===
★ Kristie Baker – Happy New Year, Charlie Brown! (Lee Mendelson/Bill Melendez Productions)

- Drew Barrymore – Star Fairies (Hanna-Barbera)
- Suzanne Pollatschek – The Great Mouse Detective (Disney)
- Bettina – Rainbow Brite and the Star Stealer (Warner Bros)
- Tiffany Reinbolt – You're a Good Man, Charlie Brown (Lee Mendelson/Bill Melendez Productions)
- Samantha Newark – Jem (Hasbro\Marvel Productions/Sunbow Productions)

== Best Family Entertainment ==
=== Exceptional Family TV Special or Movie of the Week ===
★ CBS Schoolbreak Special – God, The Universe, And Hot Fudge Sundaes (CBS)

- A Time To Tell (Disney)
- A Time To Live (NBC)
- Alex: The Life Of A Child (ABC)
- ABC Afterschool Special – Don't Touch (ABC)
- The Life & Adventures of Santa Claus (ABC-Lorimar)

=== Exceptional New Family Television Comedy or Drama Series – Fall 1986 Season ===
★ Our House (NBC)

- ALF (NBC)
- Head of the Class (ABC)
- Heart of the City (ABC)
- One Big Family (Syn.)
- Together We Stand (CBS)

=== Exceptional Family Animation Series or Specials ===
★ Jim Henson's Muppet Babies (Jim Henson Productions/Marvel Productions)

- Disney's Adventures of the Gummi Bears (Disney)
- He-Man and the Masters of the Universe (Filmation)
- Alvin and The Chipmunks (Ruby-Spears)
- The Berenstain Bears (Southern Star Productions)
- Star Fairies (Hanna Barbera)

=== Exceptional Feature Film – Family Entertainment: Animation ===
★ Rainbow Brite (Warner Bros.)

- The Transformers: The Movie (Marvel Productions)
- The Great Mouse Detective (Disney)

=== Exceptional Feature Film – Family Entertainment: Fantasy or Comedy ===
★ The Dirt Bike Kid (Trinity Pictures, Inc.)

- Enemy Mine (20th Century Fox)
- Legend (Universal)
- Rad (Tri-star)
- The Boy Who Could Fly (M-G-M)
- Young Sherlock Holmes (Paramount)

=== Exceptional Feature Film – Family Entertainment: Drama ===
★ The Karate Kid Part II (Columbia)

- Flight of the Navigator (Disney)
- Lucas (20th Century Fox)
- One Magic Christmas (Disney)
- Papa Was a Preacher (LaRose Productions)
- Space Camp (20th Century Fox)

== Youth In Film's Special Awards ==
=== Most Inspiring Family Commercial ===
★ "Father and Son" – Pacific Bell

=== Most Promising Young Recording Artist Male and Female ===
★ Jimmy Salvemini and Tiffany Renee

=== Performing Arts Scholarship ===
★ Wendy Anderson

=== Exceptional Foreign Film – Family Entertainment ===
★ Little House Under the Moon (China) – Deputy Director: Jie Yu; Director: Yuqiang Zhang.

=== Ensemble Award ===
==== Ensemble Cast in a Television Series ====
★ Kids Incorporated – Ensemble: Ryan Lambert, Renee Sands, Rahsaan Patterson, Stacy Ferguson and Martika.

=== The Michael Landon Award ===
==== Outstanding Contribution to Youth Through Television ====
===== Ensemble Cast in a Television Special =====
★ Babies Having Babies – Ensemble: Akosua Busia, Renee Estevez, Lori Loughlin, Claudia Wells and Jill Whelan; Director: Martin Sheen.

=== The Jackie Coogan Award ===
==== Outstanding Contribution to Youth Through Motion Picture ====
===== Ensemble Cast in a Feature Film =====
★ Stand By Me – Ensemble: Wil Wheaton, River Phoenix, Corey Feldman and Jerry O'Connell.
