= 7th Youth in Film Awards =

1985 US media awards ceremony

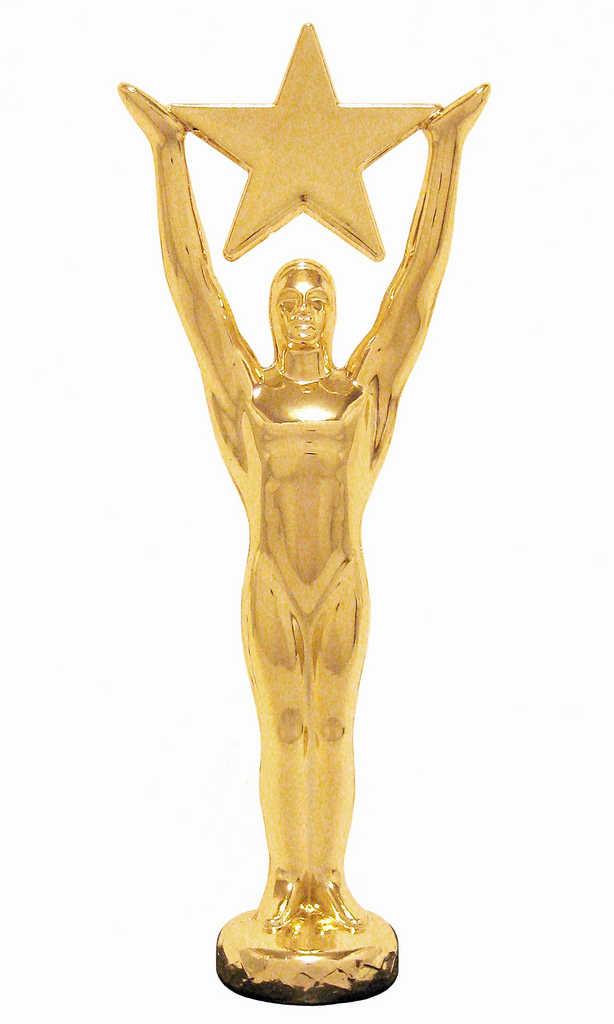
- Awarded for: Achievement in the 1984—1985 season
- Date: December 15, 1985
- Site: Coconut Grove; Ambassador Hotel; Los Angeles, California
- Hosted by: Drew Barrymore

The 7th Youth in Film Awards ceremony (now known as the Young Artist Awards), presented by the Youth in Film Association, honored outstanding youth performers under the age of 21 in the fields of film and television for the 1984-1985 season, and took place on December 15, 1985, at the Ambassador Hotel's historical Coconut Grove night club in Los Angeles, California. Hosting the ceremony that year was 10-year-old Drew Barrymore.

Established in 1978 by long-standing Hollywood Foreign Press Association member, Maureen Dragone, the Youth in Film Association was the first organization to establish an awards ceremony specifically set to recognize and award the contributions of performers under the age of 18 in the fields of film, television, theater and music.

== Categories ==
★ Bold indicates the winner in each category.

★ Conflicting reports indicates a conflict in information between the Young Artist Awards official website's list of winners for that year and the Daily News of Los Angeles' list of winners published the day after the ceremony. The Young Artist Award's official website states that - "The Internet Movie Database has been used to ensure correct information is maintained on this web site". However, IMDb was launched in 1990 (five years after the 7th Youth in Film Awards ceremony was held) and is largely a user-generated website.

== Best Young Performer in a Motion Picture ==
=== Best Starring Performance By a Young Actor - Motion Picture ===
★ Corey Haim - Silver Bullet (Paramount Pictures)

- Sean Astin - The Goonies (Warner Bros)
- Lukas Haas - Witness (Paramount)
- Ethan Hawke - Explorers (Paramount)
- Barret Oliver - D.A.R.Y.L. (Paramount)
- Jason Lively - National Lampoon's European Vacation (Warner Bros)

=== Best Starring Performance By a Young Actress - Motion Picture ===
★ Meredith Salenger - The Journey of Natty Gann (Disney)

- Fairuza Balk - Return to Oz (Disney)
- Drew Barrymore - Cat's Eye (MGM/UA)
- Joyce Hyser - Just One of the Guys (Columbia)
- Amanda Peterson - Explorers (Paramount)

=== Exceptional Performance By a Young Actor - Motion Picture ===
★ Corey Haim - Firstborn (Paramount)

- River Phoenix - Explorers (Paramount)
- Jeff Cohen - The Goonies (Warner Bros)
- Corey Feldman - The Goonies (Warner Bros)
- Billy Jacoby - Just One of the Guys (Columbia)
- Gabriel Jarret - Real Genius (Tri-Star Pictures)
- Joey Lawrence - Summer Rental (Paramount)

=== Exceptional Performance By a Young Actress - Motion Picture ===
★ Sydney Penny - Pale Rider (Warner Bros)

- Kerri Green - Summer Rental (Paramount)
- Martha Plimpton - The Goonies (Warner Bros)
- Emma Ridley - Return to Oz (Disney)

== Best Young Performer in a Television Special or Mini-Series ==
=== Best Young Actor Starring in a Television Special or Mini-Series ===
★ (Conflicting reports) Chad Allen - Code of Vengeance (NBC) - (Winner declared by the Daily News of Los Angeles)
★ (Conflicting reports) River Phoenix - Surviving: A Family in Crisis (ABC) - (Winner declared by the Young Artist Awards website)

- Robert Chestnut - CBS Schoolbreak Special - Contract for Life: The S.A.D.D. Story (CBS)
- Billy Lombardo - Punky Brewster two-part special: "Fenster Hall" (NBC)
- Edoardo Ponti - Aurora (NBC)

=== Best Young Actress Starring in a Television Special or Mini-Series ===
★ (Conflicting reports) Laura Jacoby - The Night They Saved Christmas (ABC) - (Winner declared by the Young Artist Awards website)
★ (Conflicting reports) Carrie Wells - The Bad Seed (ABC) - (Winner declared by the Daily News of Los Angeles)

- Missy Francis - CBS Schoolbreak Special - The War Between Classes (CBS)
- Fran Robinson - PBS WonderWorks - Words By Heart (Wonderworks/PBS)

=== Exceptional Performance By a Young Actor in a Television Special or Mini-Series ===
★ Joshua Miller - Highway to Heaven (episode "A Song for Jason") (NBC)

- David Faustino - I Had Three Wives (CBS)
- Scott Grimes - It Came Upon the Midnight Clear (Metromedia/KTTV)
- Jamie McEnnan - Deadly Intentions (ABC)
- Bryan Price - The Lady From Yesterday (CBS)
- Carl Steven - Heart of a Champion: The Ray Mancini Story (CBS)

=== Exceptional Performance By a Young Actress in a Television Special or Mini-Series ===
★ Christa Denton - Not My Kid (CBS)

- Bridgette Andersen - A Summer to Remember (CBS)
- Katy Kurtzman - CBS Schoolbreak Special - Student Court (CBS)
- Heather O'Rourke - Surviving: A Family in Crisis (ABC)
- Priscilla Weems - Scene of the Crime (episode "The Babysitter") (CBS)

== Best Young Performer in a Television Series ==
=== Best Young Actor Starring in a Television Series ===
★ (Conflicting reports) Emmanuel Lewis - Webster (ABC) - (Winner declared by the Daily News of Los Angeles)
★ (Conflicting reports) Marc Price - Family Ties (NBC) - (Winner declared by the Young Artist Awards website)

- Danny Cooksey - Diff'rent Strokes (ABC)
- Frederick Koehler - Kate & Allie (CBS)
- Joey Lawrence - Gimme a Break! (NBC)
- Alfonso Ribeiro - Silver Spoons (NBC)

=== Best Young Actress Starring in a Television Series ===
★ (Conflicting reports) Lisa Bonet - The Cosby Show (NBC) - (Winner declared by the Daily News of Los Angeles)
★ (Conflicting reports) Soleil Moon Frye - Punky Brewster (NBC) - (Winner declared by the Young Artist Awards website)

- Tricia Cast - It's Your Move (NBC)
- Ari Meyers - Kate & Allie (CBS)
- Allison Smith - Kate & Allie (CBS)
- Jill Whelan - The Love Boat (ABC)

=== Best Young Supporting Actor in a Television Series ===
★ Mackenzie Astin - The Facts of Life (NBC)

- Casey Ellison - Punky Brewster (NBC)
- Michael Pearlman - Charles in Charge (CBS) (mistakenly credited on the Young Artist Awards website as "David Pearlman")
- Danny Pintauro - Who's the Boss? (ABC)
- Jonathan Ward - Charles in Charge (CBS)

=== Best Young Supporting Actress in a Television Series ===
★ Alyssa Milano - Who's the Boss? (ABC)

- Ami Foster - Punky Brewster (NBC)
- Cherie Johnson - Punky Brewster (NBC)
- April Lerman - Charles in Charge (CBS)
- Shalane McCall - Dallas (CBS)

== Best Young Performer in a New Television Series ==
=== Best Young Actor Starring in a New Television Series ===
★ Kirk Cameron - Growing Pains (ABC)

- Taliesin Jaffe - Hail to the Chief (ABC)
- Robby Kiger - Crazy Like a Fox (CBS)
- Kristoff St. John - Charlie & Co. (CBS)
- Jerry Supiran - Small Wonder (Metromedia KTTV)

=== Best Young Actress Starring in a New Television Series ===
★ (Conflicting reports) Tracey Gold - Growing Pains (ABC) - (Winner declared by the Daily News of Los Angeles)
★ (Conflicting reports) Tracy Wells - Mr. Belvedere (ABC) - (Winner declared by the Young Artist Awards website)

- Tiffany Brissette - Small Wonder (Metromedia KTTV)
- Regina King - 227 (NBC)
- Fran Robinson - Charlie & Co. (CBS)

=== Best Young Supporting Actor in a New Television Series ===
★ Jeremy Miller - Growing Pains (ABC)

- Brice Beckham - Mr. Belvedere (ABC)
- Jaleel White - Charlie & Co. (CBS)

=== Best Young Supporting Actress in a New Television Series ===
★ Emily Schulman - Small Wonder (Metromedia KTTV)

- Maia Brewton - Lime Street (ABC)
- Mandy Ingber - Detective in the House (CBS)

== Best Young Performer in a Regular Daytime Serial ==
=== Outstanding Young Actor - Regular Daytime Serial ===
★ (Conflicting reports) Brandon Call - Santa Barbara (NBC) - (Winner declared by the Young Artist Awards website)
★ (Conflicting reports) David Mendenhall - General Hospital (ABC) - (Winner declared by the Daily News of Los Angeles)

- Anthony Barton - Capitol (CBS)
- Danny Gellis - Capitol (CBS)
- Trevor Richard - Another World (NBC)

=== Outstanding Young Actress - Regular Daytime Serial ===
★ Kimberly McCullough - General Hospital (ABC)

- Kristian Alfonso - Days of Our Lives (NBC)
- Andrea Barber - Days of Our Lives (NBC)
- Melissa Brennan - Santa Barbara (NBC)
- Lisa Trusel - Days of Our Lives (NBC)

== Best Young Performer: Guest in a Television Series ==
=== Best Young Actor - Guest in a Television Series ===
★ Bumper Robinson – Cagney & Lacey (CBS)

- Chad Allen – Webster (ABC)
- Jason Hervey – Wildside (ABC)
- Bobby Jacoby – Highway to Heaven (NBC)
- Taliesin Jaffe – Hell Town (NBC)
- Danny Nucci – Hotel (ABC)
- Danny Ponce – Hell Town (NBC)
- Vonni Ribisi – Highway to Heaven (episode "A Song for Jason") (NBC)
- Donald Thompson – Diff'rent Strokes (NBC)

=== Best Young Actress - Guest in a Television Series ===
★ Jaclyn Bernstein – The Twilight Zone (episode "Children's Zoo) (CBS)

- Rachel Bouchet – Silver Spoons (NBC)
- Wendy Brainard – MacGruder and Loud (ABC)
- Tanya Fenmore – Trapper John, M.D. (CBS)
- Missy Francis – Hotel (episode "Rallying Cry") (ABC)
- Angela Lee – Hotel (episode "Detours") (ABC)
- Jenny Lewis – The Twilight Zone (episode "If She Dies") (CBS)
- Marissa Mendenhall – Hunter (episode "Lost Pigeons") (NBC)
- Bettina Rae – Bobby Vinton Variety Show (Metromedia/KTTV)
- Kristy Swanson – Cagney & Lacey (episode "On The Street" 5th-season premiere) (CBS)

== Best Young Performer: Animation Voice-Over ==
=== Outstanding Young Actor - Animation Voice-Over ===
★ David Mendenhall - The Berenstain Bears (Southern Star-Hanna Barbera/Australia)

- Noah Hathaway - CBS Storybreak Special - How To Eat Fried Worms (CBS)
- Christian Jacobs - Disney's Adventures of the Gummi Bears (Disney)
- Josh Rodine - ABC Weekend Special - The Velveteen Rabbit (Hanna-Barbera)
- Jeremy Schoenberg - The Charlie Brown and Snoopy Show (Lee Mendelson/Bill Melendez Productions)
- David Wagner - The Littles (DIC Enterprises)

=== Outstanding Young Actress - Animation Voice-Over ===
★ (Conflicting reports) Bettina Bush - The Littles and Rainbow Brite (DIC Enterprises) - (Winner declared by the Daily News of Los Angeles)
★ (Conflicting reports) Gini Holtzman - Charlie Brown & Snoopy Show (Mendelson/Melendez) - (Winner declared by the Young Artist Awards website)

- Cassandra Coblentz - Happily Ever After (Bill Melendez Productions/Wonderworks/PBS)
- Christina Lange - The Berenstain Bears (Southern Star-Hanna Barbera/Australia)
- Holly Berger - Inspector Gadget (DIC Enterprises)
- Tonia Gayle Smith - Dungeons & Dragons (Marvel Productions)

== Best Family Entertainment ==
=== Best Family Television Special ===
★ A Reason to Live (NBC)

- CBS Schoolbreak Special - Contract for Life: The S.A.D.D. Story (CBS)
- ABC Afterschool Special - No Greater Gift (ABC)
- Surviving: A Family in Crisis (ABC)
- PBS WonderWorks - Words by Heart (PBS)

=== Best New Television Series - Comedy or Drama ===
★ Growing Pains (ABC)

- Charlie & Company (CBS)
- Hell Town (NBC)
- Lime Street (ABC)
- Mr. Belvedere (ABC)
- Small Wonder Metromedia (KTTV)

=== Best Family Animation Series or Special ===
★ The Charlie Brown and Snoopy Show (Medelson-Melendez-Schulz)

- The Berenstain Bears (Southern Star-Hanna Barbera)
- The Care Bears Movie (Samuel Goldwyn Company)
- He-Man and the Masters of the Universe (Filmation)
- Mr. T (Ruby-Spears)

=== Best Family Motion Picture - Comedy or Musical ===
★ (Conflicting reports) The Heavenly Kid (Orion Pictures) - (Winner declared by the Young Artist Awards website)
★ (Conflicting reports) Pee-wee's Big Adventure (Warner Brothers) - (Winner declared by the Daily News of Los Angeles)

- Just One of the Guys (Columbia)
- Real Genius (Tri-Star Pictures)
- Summer Rental (Paramount)

=== Best Family Motion Picture - Adventure ===
★ Back to the Future (Universal)

- D.A.R.Y.L. (Paramount)
- Explorers (Paramount)
- The Goonies (Warner Brothers)
- Ladyhawke (Warner Brothers)

=== Best Family Motion Picture - Drama ===
★ Cocoon (20th Century Fox)

- The Journey of Natty Gann (Disney)
- Starman (Columbia)
- Sylvester (Columbia)
- Witness (Paramount)

== Youth In Film's Special Awards ==
=== Best Young Actor in a Foreign Film ===
★ Kristjan Markersen (Denmark) - Otto Is A Rhino (Metronome Productions)

=== Best Young Actress in a Foreign Film ===
★ Shiori Sakura (Japan) - MacArthur's Children (Orion Classics)

=== Best Foreign Family Film ===
★ Otto is a Rhino (Otto er et Nasehorn) (Denmark) - Directed by Rumle Hammerich
