= Robert Jayne =

American actor (born 1973)

- Born: July 16, 1973 (age 53)
- Other name: Bobby Jacoby
- Occupations: Real estate developer, designer, actor, blackjack player
- Years active: 1979–present
- Spouse: Not married
- Children: 2

Robert Jayne (born July 16, 1973), also known as Bobby Jacoby, is an American actor, real estate developer and professional blackjack player.

== Career ==
Starting his career as a child actor, he has appeared in many television series as well as films. His television credits include: Perfect Strangers, Knots Landing, The Greatest American Hero, St. Elsewhere, Manimal, The Love Boat, Highway to Heaven, Murder She Wrote, Diff'rent Strokes, Who's the Boss?, T.J. Hooker, The A-Team, Cagney and Lacey, Hill Street Blues, The Wonder Years, Jake and the Fatman, Land of the Lost, Walker Texas Ranger, Baywatch, Tremors, The Lazarus Man and Ernie alongside Dick Christie, Marla Pennington, Jerry Supiran, Emily Schulman & Tiffany Brissette in Small Wonder.

His film credits include: Iron Eagle, Tremors, Tremors 3: Back to Perfection, Meet the Applegates, Night of the Demons 2, and Wizards of the Lost Kingdom II, and the 1993 film titled The Day My Parents Ran Away.

He also supplied the voice of "Dorin" in the animated television series Wildfire, and directed and wrote the 2010 short film The Broker.

Jayne has spent his adult life cultivating a career in real estate development and construction strategy expertise. Recognized in spatial design, his work has been featured in the Los Angeles Times. With work focused on "turn-around properties", Jayne opened RJC Design + Build, Inc.

In 1998, Jayne became a world-class blackjack player, and played blackjack professionally with a team of well-known card counters from 2000 to 2005. In his 2010 book Repeat until Rich, Josh Axelrad describes his experiences in Las Vegas with Jayne and a team of card counters as they use "Big Player" and "Call-in" tactics to win millions of dollars. Jayne became a well known player and was entered into a blacklist by the Griffin Agency, known for supplying intelligence information to casinos regarding players that can "hurt" the casino by winning money.

Under the name "Bobby J", Jayne played in the first World Series of Blackjack against such notables Stanford Wong and Hollywood Dave. It pitted some of the best and well-known blackjack players from around the world.

== Personal life ==
Jayne's siblings, Billy Jayne, Susan Jayne, Laura Jacoby, as well as his half-brother Scott Jacoby are also actors. Jayne is of Jewish descent.

== Filmography ==
Year	Title	Role	Notes
1985	The Zoo Gang	Ricky Haskell	
1985	Fever Pitch	Gam-a-teen Boy	
1985	Small Wonder	Ernie / Stanley	3 episodes
1985-86	Diff'rent Strokes	Ricky	5 episodes
1986	Iron Eagle	Matthew	
1987	Who's The Boss?	Walter	1 episode; credited as Bobby Jacoby
1987	Perfect Strangers	Eddie	S2, E17; credited as Bobby Jacoby
1988	After School	Basketball Player #3	
1989	Dr. Alien	Bradford Littlejohn	
1989	Wizards of the Lost Kingdom II	Tyor	
1990	Tremors	Melvin Plug	
1990	Meet the Applegates	Johnny Applegate	
1994	Night of the Demons 2	Perry	
1996	Boy Meets World	Jeff	1 episode
1997	Walker, Texas Ranger	Ranger Danny O'Bannon	1 episode
1998	Can't Hardly Wait	Homeboy #2	
2000	The Right Temptation	Travis	
2001	Pearl Harbor	Sunburnt Sailor	
2001	Tremors 3: Back to Perfection	Melvin Plug	
2003	Tremors	Melvin Plug	TV series
2006	Beyond the Wall of Sleep	Jasper	
2007	Bee Movie	Bee #4	Voice; uncredited
2013	Carlos Spills the Beans	Chuck	
2014	Mythica: A Quest for Heroes	Peregus Malister	
2015	Mythica: The Darkspore	Peregus Malister	
2015	Mythica: The Necromancer	Peregus Malister	
