= List of Small Wonder episodes =

This is a list of episodes for the 1980s television series Small Wonder.

== Series overview ==
Shout! Factory has released the first two seasons of Small Wonder on DVD in Region 1. Season 2 was released as a Shout! Factory select title, available exclusively through their online store.

Season	Episodes	Originally released	
Season	Episodes	First released	Last released
1	24	September 7, 1985	May 17, 1986
2	24	September 13, 1986	May 23, 1987
3	24	September 12, 1987	May 21, 1988
4	24	September 17, 1988	May 20, 1989

== Episodes ==
=== Season 1 (1985–86) ===
No. overall	No. in season	Title	Directed by	Written by	Original release date	Prod. code
1	1	"Vicki's Homecoming"	John Bowab	Howard Leeds	September 7, 1985	101
Ted Lawson introduces his family to V.I.C.I. (or the Voice Input Child Identicant), a secretly constructed robotic domestic aide in the form of a young girl.
2	2	"The Neighbors"	Peter Baldwin	Ed Jurist	September 14, 1985	102
The Brindles, the Lawsons' snoopy neighbors, suspect the Lawsons are hiding something and attempt to sniff out their family secret, while Harriet shows off her toy robot. Note: Edie McClurg and William Bogert made their first appearances as Bonnie and Brandon Brindle.
3	3	"The Sitter"	Peter Baldwin	Warren Murray	September 21, 1985	103
When the Lawsons' babysitter cancels, Ted sees an opportunity for a new function for Vicki.
4	4	"The Suitor"	Leslie H. Martinson	Howard Meyers	September 28, 1985	104
Jamie's friend Warren, the school nerd, falls in love with Vicki, the only girl who doesn't slam the door in his face. Note: Daryl T. Bartley makes his first appearance as Warren Enright.
5	5	"Sibling Rivalry"	Linda Day	Ann L. Gibbs & Joel Kimmel	October 5, 1985	105
Jamie becomes jealous of his parents' attention to Vicki and runs away from home.
6	6	"Spielberg, Jr."	Leslie H. Martinson	Jerry Winnick	October 12, 1985	106
When Jamie and his friend Reggie produce a sci-fi movie project for school, the directorial power goes to Jamie's head. Note: Paul C. Scott makes his first appearance as Jamie's best friend Reggie Williams.
7	7	"The Lie"	Linda Day	Budd Grossman	October 19, 1985	107
Jamie learns the value of consistent honesty when he can't convince his parents that he's not responsible for breaking a teapot.
8	8	"The Bully"	John Bowab	Jurgen Wolff	October 26, 1985	108
When a bully begins extorting money from Jamie and his friends, Ted attempts to teach Jamie how to fight.
9	9	"Slightly Dishonorable"	Peter Baldwin	Sy Gomberg	November 2, 1985	109
Jamie uses Vicki to do his homework and reaches the school's honor roll.
10	10	"The Adoption"	John Bowab	Adrienne Armstrong & Mitzi McCall	November 9, 1985	110
After Bonnie Brindle alerts child protective services about the Lawsons' new child, Vicki must pass a medical exam.
11	11	"Child Genius"	Peter Baldwin	John Boni	November 16, 1985	111
With child protective services watching, the Lawsons must hire a tutor for Vicki, and Joan resolves to complete her teaching degree.
12	12	"Ted's New Boss"	Leslie H. Martinson	Lan O'Kun	November 23, 1985	112
Following a house fire, the Brindles muscle their way into staying with the Lawsons.
13	13	"Brainwashed"	Selig Frank	Warren Murray	November 30, 1985	113
When Vicki begins to mimic Harriet, Ted reprograms her.
14	14	"The Burrito Story"	Peter Baldwin	Howard Albrecht & Sol Weinstein	January 4, 1986	114
Jamie attempts to mass-produce burritos made by Vicki.
15	15	"The Camping Trip"	Peter Baldwin	Jurgen Wolff	January 11, 1986	115
The Lawsons, Reggie and Harriet take a wilderness camping trip and become lost.
16	16	"Love Story"	Leslie Martinson	Howard Meyers	January 18, 1986	116
Jamie throws a lavish party to impress his first crush, Jessica. Note: Lehann Jones makes her first appearance as Jessica.
17	17	"Substitute Father"	Bob Claver	John Boni	January 25, 1986	117
Brandon Brindle finds that a golf-crazed Ted has been neglecting Jamie.
18	18	"The Robot Nappers"	Selig Frank	Aubrey Tadman & Garry Ferrier	February 8, 1986	118
A rival robotics firm suspects that Vicki is a robot and plans to steal her.
19	19	"The Company Takeover"	Peter Baldwin	John Boni	February 15, 1986	120
Cutbacks at United Robotronics have the Lawsons scrambling for odd jobs.
20	20	"Good Ol' Lou"	Peter Baldwin	Sol Weinstein & Howard Albrecht	February 22, 1986	123
Ted is motivated to get the family into shape when an obese coworker loses a record amount of weight. Note: Emily Schulman did not appear in this episode.
21	21	"Like Father, Like Son"	Bob Claver	Howard Meyers	March 1, 1986	121
Jamie tries to make for the pee-wee football team.
22	22	"Show Biz (a.k.a. Vaudeville Vicki)"	Peter Baldwin	Aubrey Tadman & Garry Ferrier	May 3, 1986	122
A vaudeville actor (Ken Berry) becomes convinced that Vicki is his long-lost daughter.
23	23	"The Real Facts of Life"	Leslie H. Martinson	Ed Jurist	May 10, 1986	119
Jamie attempts to educate his dad in the ways of love.
24	24	"The Grandparents"	Selig Frank	Dick Christie & Tom Amundsen & David Ruprecht	May 17, 1986	124
Ted reveals to his visiting parents that Vicki is a robot. Note: Vicki begins showing emotions by crying.

=== Season 2 (1986–87) ===
No. overall	No. in season	Title	Directed by	Written by	Original release date	Prod. code
25	1	"Chewed Out"	Leslie H. Martinson	Bruce Taylor	September 13, 1986	215
Jamie and Reggie try smoking for the first time in an effort to be mature. Vicki tries smoking too, which angers Ted. Adam Rich guest stars.
26	2	"Money, Money, Money"	Selig Frank	Howard Meyers	September 20, 1986	201
Jamie thinks that his crush Jessica will only like him if he has a lot of money.
27	3	"My Mother the Teacher"	Selig Frank	Bruce Taylor	September 27, 1986	203
When Jamie's teacher is ill, Joan Lawson gets hired as a substitute. She lets Jamie, Vicki and all Jamie's friends know there will be no favoritism nor nepotism in her classroom.
28	4	"Here Comes the Judge"	Selig Frank	Jeffrey Davis	October 4, 1986	213
Jamie plays a judge in his school's mock courtroom.
29	5	"Home Sweet Homeless"	Selig Frank	Susan Misty Stewart	October 11, 1986	209
The Lawson family gets first-hand experience about how a homeless man lives when Jamie accidentally brings one home. Foster Brooks guest stars.
30	6	"Crazy Like a Fox"	Peter Baldwin	Barry Blitzer	October 18, 1986	212
A con man sells Jamie and Vicki stolen merchandise that doesn't work.
31	7	"The Older Woman"	Selig Frank	Michael Poryes	October 25, 1986	210
Jamie meets Harriet's older cousin Mary, so he makes a plan to get to know Mary better.
32	8	"Who's the Boss?"	Peter Baldwin	Warren Murray & Bruce Kane	November 1, 1986	204
Jamie has a dream that he's the boss of his parents.
33	9	"P-P-P Paula"	Peter Baldwin	Lawrence H. Levy	November 8, 1986	207
Jamie is assigned to help a stuttering girl present an oral report. Vicki decides to get to the root of the stuttering through aversion therapy.
34	10	"You Gotta Have Heart"	Leslie H. Martinson	Jerry Rannow	November 15, 1986	211
Vicki becomes best friends with Harriet in order to learn more about love, while Ted thinks about inventing a heart for Vicki.
35	11	"The Shoplifter"	Leslie H. Martinson	Bruce Taylor	November 22, 1986	202
Mrs. Fernwald from Child Services visits the Lawson family on the basis it is Vicki's birthday. Mistaking the news for Joan's birthday, Vicki steals a gold ladies' watch.
36	12	"Thanksgiving Story"	Bob Claver	Gary Belkin	November 29, 1986	208
Jamie's friend Adam, who has a deadbeat dad, says that he will get to go a fancy ski resort for Thanksgiving sponsored by a charity aiding such children. Not wanting to spend another boring old Thanksgiving with his family, Jamie uses Vicki to fabricate a story about being from a broken home.
37	13	"Neighborhood Watch"	Leslie H. Martinson	Phil Margo & Jack Gross	December 6, 1986	206
The Lawson family gets robbed so they develop a neighborhood watch program.
38	14	"Movin' Up"	Bob Claver	Jerry Ross	January 10, 1987	205
Ted is offered a job at a prestigious technology firm in Massachusetts with big benefits, but wants the family's candid opinion about such a move. Ted must make his decision when the firm's pretentious president and his wife pay the Lawsons a visit to look at the entire family.
39	15	"Top Secret"	Leslie H. Martinson	Kevin Hopps & Glenn Leopold	January 17, 1987	221
Ted makes up a story about Project Blender to make his job sound exciting. Brian Austin Green (listed as Brian Green in this episode) plays Gary, a friend of Jamie's.
40	16	"The Personality Kid"	Peter Baldwin	Ben Starr	January 24, 1987	218
Reggie thinks Vicki has a stuck-up personality, so Jamie gives her an adjustment.
41	17	"Matchmaker, Matchmaker"	Bob Claver	Story by : Jerry Ross; Teleplay by : Jerry Ross & Jeffrey Duteil	January 31, 1987	216
Jamie wants a new bike so he starts a computer dating service. Two of his clients are a bully and a diffident nerd friend of his. Due to threats from the bully, Jamie must fix him up with Vicki, while Vicki prefers impersonating Marilyn Monroe to be the nerd's date.
42	18	"Little Miss Shopping Mall"	Bob Claver	Howard Albrecht & Sol Weinstein	February 7, 1987	223
Vicki gets entered into a beauty contest, but Ted doesn't want her to enter. Note: Jerry Supiran, does not appear in this episode. Supiran's absence was explained, that his character Jamie was spending the weekend with his friend, Reggie.
43	19	"Victor/Vicki-toria"	Peter Baldwin	Warren Murray & Bruce Kane	February 14, 1987	214
Jamie disguises Vicki as a boy named Victor to aid his struggling baseball team. However Ted tries to dissuade Jamie from this, arguing that with Vicki's abilities this would be extremely unfair.
44	20	"Look Into My Eyes"	Peter Baldwin	Don Hart & Robin Pennington	February 21, 1987	222
Vicki tries out hypnosis on the Lawsons after she sees it performed on television.
45	21	"Wally the Wimp"	Peter Baldwin	Story by : David Ruprecht; Teleplay by : Dick Christie & Tom Amundsen	February 28, 1987	217
Joan gets a visit from her college friend Wally. Guest star: Jesse "The Body" Ventura.
46	22	"The Cat's Meow"	Bob Claver	Donald Ross	May 9, 1987	219
Ted buys Vicki her first toy, a robot cat that causes Vicki to have an emotional breakdown.
47	23	"Vicki Goodwrench"	Selig Frank	Ken Steele	May 16, 1987	220
Jamie wants to get a summer job, so he and Vicki decide to work at Sid's Garage. Vicki learns about motors and greatly increases the gas mileage of cars, causing sheiks and oil executives to beat a path to the Lawsons' door.
48	24	"Double Wedding"	Leslie H. Martinson	Warren Murray & Bruce Kane	May 23, 1987	224
Ted and Joan, along with Bonnie and Brandon Brindle, decide to renew their wedding vows.

=== Season 3 (1987–88) ===
No. overall	No. in season	Title	Directed by	Written by	Original release date	Prod. code
49	1	"Woodward and Bernstein"	Leslie H. Martinson	Bobby Herbeck	September 12, 1987	303
While Jamie and Reggie search for a story for the school paper, Vicki discovers that a new girl in class is a missing child. Note: The new theme song is now sung in B-Flat-Major by a woman.
50	2	"Everyone Into the Pool"	Bob Claver	Judy Bustany & Dawn Aldredge	September 19, 1987	312
The Lawsons get a new swimming pool and, Vicki falls in while rescuing Harriet.
51	3	"Whodunit?"	Leslie H. Martinson	Steve Granat & Mel Sherer	September 26, 1987	314
Jamie takes the fall in exchange for Jessica's affections when he catches her stealing copies of the seventh grade's test.
52	4	"Bride and Groom"	Selig Frank	Story by : Bernard Burnell Mack; Teleplay by : Warren Murray & Bruce Kane	October 3, 1987	306
The daughter of Ted's new boss has plans on making Jamie her husband.
53	5	"It's Okay to Say No"	Bob Claver	Matt Geller	October 10, 1987	302
When a schoolyard pusher tries to hook Vicki on drugs, the Lawsons help the police on an undercover sting, to stop the pusher.
54	6	"Read My Lips"	Leslie H. Martinson	Matt Geller	October 17, 1987	307
When Jamie befriends a deaf boy to earn scout points, he learns a lesson in sensitivity and exploitation.
55	7	"The Promotion"	Leslie H. Martinson	David Silverman & Stephen Sustarsic	October 24, 1987	316
In order to gain a promotion, Ted decides to reveal Vicki's robot secret to his boss -- unaware that Brandon is out to sabotage Ted's effort.
56	8	"The Lawsonville Horror"	Selig Frank	Story by : David Ruprecht; Teleplay by : Dick Christie & Tom Amundsen	October 31, 1987	320
When unseen Vicki is struck by lightning and begins to influence objects around the house, the unwary and shook-up Lawsons call in a pair of hapless ghostbusters.
57	9	"The Bad Seed"	Bob Claver	David Silverman & Stephen Sustarsic	November 7, 1987	308
Ted brings home Vanessa, an upgraded twin of Vicki whose revolutionary but quirky quasi-human artificial intelligence runs amok. Note: Tiffany Brissette plays a dual role.
58	10	"TV or Not TV"	Selig Frank	Story by : Barbara London & Reigne Christi; Teleplay by : Warren Murray & Bruce Kane	November 14, 1987	318
Vicki is discovered by an advertising recruiter (David Ruprecht) to play in a cereal commercial, but the Lawsons have second thoughts when her taste test reveals that the product isn't all it's crackled up to be.
59	11	"The Fats of Life"	Bob Claver	Stan Cutler	November 21, 1987	317
Ted unwittingly upgrades Vicki's energy-supplementing polynucleotide processor with an appetite, which creates excess digestive gases and causes her to be bloated which caused a major issue for an upcoming dance.
60	12	"The Bank Job"	Bob Claver	Paul Hunter	November 28, 1987	309
Vicki, Jamie and Harriet are held hostage in an inept bank robbery.
61	13	"Oooga Mooga"	Leslie H. Martinson	Warren Murray & Bruce Kane	December 5, 1987	305
A Christmas show wherein Joan borrows a life-sized animated "doll" from a store for a charity show -- until Brandon gets his hands on it.
62	14	"Here Today, Gone Tomorrow"	Selig Frank	Stephen Langford	January 16, 1988	301
After Ted makes a comment that he's dead if his credit gets cut off after a few unpaid bills, Vicki types "Cut off credit - He's dead!" into his bank account information on the computer. Ted tries to correct it at the bank, but they still don't believe he's alive even when standing in front of them, so he creates a plan to stage a fake funeral. Meanwhile, Jamie tries to sell "Christmas tree seeds" to make money.
63	15	"Bye Bye Brindles"	Selig Frank	Gordon Mitchell	January 23, 1988	304
Upset with the Brindles, Ted and Joan make a few comments that Vicki repeats to Harriet, which leads to an argument where Brandon demands the Lawsons move. Using Vicki's strength, the Lawsons stage a fake earthquake to scare the Brindles into selling their home. Obnoxious punk rockers move in, so Ted creates a fake story about oil to get Brandon to cancel the sale.
64	16	"For Sale by Robot"	Leslie H. Martinson	Steve Granat & Mel Sherer	January 30, 1988	319
Ted reviews blueprints to remodel the house while Joan receives her real estate license. While practicing with Joan for her first sales opportunity, Ted signs a contract, and when Joan's southern clients the Pflugs show up early, Vicki sells them the Lawson home and completes the contract. Ted comes up with a plan to get the Pflugs to back out of the sale while also starting his remodel project.
65	17	"Ronald McDonald House"	Dick Christie	Warren Murray & Bruce Kane	February 6, 1988	411
To help a withdrawn and bitter classmate cope with leukemia, Jamie and Joan help set up a play on fighting disease.
66	18	"The Russians are Coming, the Russians are Coming"	Leslie H. Martinson	Lawrence H. Levy	February 13, 1988	325
Vicki is chosen to represent the school against a smart Russian kid who, like Vicki, turns out to be a robot.
67	19	"I'll Drink to That"	Bob Claver	Bill Daley	February 20, 1988	311
Due to Vicki's mishandling of terms, Child Services Officer Mrs. Fernwald thinks Ted is an alcoholic and threatens to take Vicki away unless he joins Alcoholics Anonymous.
68	20	"Big J, the D.J."	Selig Frank	Pat Niedzialek & Cecile Alch	February 27, 1988	313
Jamie uses Vicki to imitate celebrities including NFL football player Lyle Alzado to get a job as lunchtime D. J. at school and Lyle -- himself, doesn't like it. Meanwhile, Brandon Brindle's sister Ida Mae stays for a week and claims to know many celebrities including Lyle.
69	21	"The Rock Band"	Bob Claver	Lisa Stotsky & Wendy Graf	April 30, 1988	324
Jamie, Reggie, Harriet and Vicki try to start a rock group to play to Ida Mae's agent friend.
70	22	"Book-It"	Selig Frank	Warren Murray & Bruce Kane	May 7, 1988	415
Jamie struggles to find a book he's interested in, as he is the last student to turn in a book report so the class can get a pizza party. This episode was sponsored by Pizza Hut for their "Book-It" reading program.
71	23	"Safety First"	Leslie H. Martinson	Ken Steele	May 14, 1988	310
Vicki imitates Ted's demonstration on how to save the life of a choking victim on Brandon, Brandon arrives the next day faking a broken neck and threatens to sue the Lawsons.
72	24	"When You Hear the Beep"	Bob Claver	Steve Kunes	May 21, 1988	321
Jamie and Vicki help Reggie pursue the girl of his dreams.

=== Season 4 (1988–89) ===
No. overall	No. in season	Title	Directed by	Written by	Original release date	Prod. code
73	1	"Divided We Stand"	Leslie H. Martinson	Barbara Azrialy & Ken Eulo	September 17, 1988	409
Ted, Jamie and Reggie go macho on an all-male fishing trip-- tailed by a slighted and competitive bevy: Joan, Vicki and Harriet.
74	2	"Double Dates"	Bob Claver	Steve Granat & Mel Sherer	September 24, 1988	413
Jamie winds up handling two dates on the same night, blind to the fact that one of them is Harriet in disguise.
75	3	"The Gang's All Here"	Selig Frank	Stan Cutler	October 1, 1988	315
Jamie stumbles into the membership of a junior high gang whose vandalism tests his sense of belonging with right and wrong -- and inducts Vicki as its moll. Adam Rich guest stars
76	4	"Rashomon"	Bob Claver	Steve Granat & Mel Sherer	October 15, 1988	422
While on a company vacation at a health resort, Jamie, Vicki, Brandon and Harriet see a burglar hitting their residence -- each with a different eyewitness account.
77	5	"Come Fly With Me"	Bob Claver	Kathy Joseph & Ted Bergman	October 22, 1988	410
The Lawsons and the Brindles are on their way to Miami for a convention for United Robotronics when the plane they're on gets hijacked. TV personality Art Linkletter appears as himself.
78	6	"Love at First Byte"	Bob Claver	Jeremy Bertrand Finch & Paul Chitlik	October 29, 1988	322
Ted brings home a voice activated computer. Vicki finds herself falling for the computer, but trouble begins when the computer becomes obsessed with Vicki.
79	7	"The Sheik"	Bob Claver	Paul Chitlik & Jeremy Bertrand Finch	November 5, 1988	405
To keep his company's presence in an Arab country, Ted lets its visiting young ruler draft Vicki into his harem.
80	8	"Togetherness"	Leslie H. Martinson	Story by : Tom Amundsen; Teleplay by : Dick Christie & David Ruprecht	November 12, 1988	403
The Lawsons enter a game show to get back at the Brindles for trying to kick them off the eligibility list. Geoff Edwards guest stars.
81	9	"My Favorite Martian"	Bob Claver	Michael Zack & Angela Wayne Randazzo	November 19, 1988	416
While Jamie tests out Ted's new laser projection system in Vicki's eyes, unwary Brandon glimpses her projection of a movie's flying saucer and calls the Air Force to investigate.
82	10	"Mommie Dearest"	Bob Claver	Warren Murphy & Bruce Kane	November 26, 1988	406
Joan's doctor father drops by to visit and Ida Mae smells a plump husband. Meanwhile, Vicki vies for school cheerleader.
83	11	"No Laughing Matter"	Leslie H. Martinson	Kenneth Koerner	December 3, 1988	407
A digestion feedback problem with Vicki's polynucleotide processor generates nitrous oxide gas that brings laughs to anyone near her, but not to Vicki herself — just as Ted's boss is about to visit about lay-offs.
84	12	"Tag, You're It"	Dick Christie	Steve Granat & Mel Sherer	December 10, 1988	401
On their first day in junior high, Vicki becomes a hall monitor and Jamie tries to avoid Harriet for a dance while vying for a class fox. Meanwhile, Ted prepares to host a cybernetics conference. Marcia Wallace guest stars.
85	13	"The Jailbirds"	Bob Claver	Richard Marcus	January 7, 1989	404
Jamie and Vicki are arrested for spray-painting a wall—and its owner's $60 shirt. Guest cast: Jo Marie Payton, F.J. O'Neil, and Dick Wilson
86	14	"Riches to Rags"	Selig Frank	Paul Chitlik & Jeremy Bertrand Finch	January 14, 1989	408
Vicki invents a miracle laundry cleaner.
87	15	"Radio Days"	Selig Frank	Isabel Wolfe & William Frischman	January 21, 1989	418
Ted prepares for a robotics interview on a local radio talk show while Jamie looks for an idea for a class play.
88	16	"Kid-O-Grams"	Leslie H. Martinson	Ralph Phillips	January 28, 1989	421
Jamie and Reggie start a singing telegram business with Vicki singing the telegrams. Meanwhile Ted starts having a midlife crisis after his birthday.
89	17	"More About LES"	Selig Frank	Paul Chitlik & Jeremy Bertrand Finch	February 4, 1989	402
L.E.S. is back, and despite Ted's assurances that the rogue A.I. program has been rendered harmless, it comes back in a big way by possessing Vicki's body as its own.
90	18	"Hooray for Hollyweird!"	Selig Frank	Jeremy Bertrand Finch & Paul Chitlik	February 11, 1989	420
Vanessa is back and accompanies the Lawsons to Hollywood for a job for United Robotronics after switching places with Vicki with the intention of becoming a star.
91	19	"Minnesota Vicki"	Bob Claver	George Crowder & Richard Harding-Gardner	February 18, 1989	419
Ted rents a pool table with the intention of getting a huge promotion from his boss, Mr. Jennings. Vicki later plays against Jennings and wins ownership of United Robotronics in the process.
92	20	"Vicki Doolittle"	Leslie H. Martinson	George Crowder & Richard Harding-Gardner	February 25, 1989	417
Ted installs a new program into Vicki that lets her understand any foreign language, as well as animals, prompting Jamie to start a "Pet Psychiatrist" business with Vicki translating the pets feelings. Also Ted volunteers Joan to plan the next company ball for United Robotronics so that they can get in for free.
93	21	"The Tattletale"	Selig Frank	Story by : Tom Amundsen; Teleplay by : Dick Christie & David Ruprecht	April 29, 1989	414
Benny, an old college chum of Ted and Joan's is up to his same trashy school paper tricks in a big city rag now, fabricating a tabloid feature which by sheer chance "exposes" Vicki as a robot just as she's about to join a fashionable clique of girls.
94	22	"The Strike"	Leslie H. Martinson	Bobby Herbeck	May 6, 1989	323
A United Robotronics strike pits shop steward Ted against management rep Brandon; Joan has her students use the strike as a social studies exercise, which also goes awry.
95	23	"See No Evil"	Leslie H. Martinson	Bobby Herbeck	May 13, 1989	412
Jamie regrets putting Vicki on guard duty for his pricey new bike when her eyes start to malfunction in a schoolyard of prowling thieves.
96	24	"Thy Neighbor's Wife"	Dick Christie	Gordon Mitchell	May 20, 1989	326
In the final episode, Brandon invites a potential employer to meet his "family"---last-minute substitutes Joan and Vicki. To help Brandon get promoted to a job in Japan, Joan pretends that she's his wife and that Vicki is their daughter Harriet and Jamie is their neighbor.
