= Molly (1999 film) =

- Theatrical release poster
- Directed by: John Duigan
- Written by: Dick Christie
- Produced by: William J. Macdonald
- Starring: Elisabeth Shue; Aaron Eckhart; Jill Hennessy; D. W. Moffett
- Cinematography: Gabriel Beristain
- Edited by: Humphrey Dixon
- Music by: Trevor Jones
- Production companies: Metro-Goldwyn-Mayer Pictures; Cockamamie Productions; Absolute Entertainment
- Distributed by: MGM Distribution Co. (United States); United International Pictures (International)
- Release date: October 22, 1999 (United States)
- Running time: 102 minutes
- Country: United States
- Language: English
- Budget: $21 million
- Box office: $17,650 (USA)

Molly is a 1999 romantic comedy-drama film about an autistic woman who comes into the custody of her neurotic executive brother. The film was directed by John Duigan and written by Dick Christie of Small Wonder-fame, and stars Elisabeth Shue as the title character, Aaron Eckhart as her older brother, and Jill Hennessy.

Not expected to do well, the film was minimally marketed and shown in only a few theaters. It was panned by critics and considered a box office bomb.

== Plot ==
An autistic woman named Molly McKay has lived in a mental institution from a young age following her parents' deaths in an automobile accident. When the institution must close on account of budget cuts, she is left in the care of her non-autistic older brother, Buck McKay. He has only ever visited on special occasions as they are estranged.

Buck is an advertising executive and perennial bachelor. In his spare time, he is building a boat. Molly, who verbalizes very little and is obsessed with lining up her shoes in neat rows, throwing Buck's life into a tailspin. He has difficulty dealing with her hygiene issues and feeding her. Unsuccessful at trying to leave Molly at a daycare, Buck is forced to take her to work. There, she runs away from her caregivers and barges into a meeting at the agency naked.

Buck convinces his assistant to look after Molly and take her home. Leaving her by a fountain while she picks up a pizza, she finds Molly playing in it, soaking herself. Soon after, Buck is let go.

Feeling stir crazy, never going out, Buck invites Sam from the institution over. Although he also has his own issues, he is highly communicative and interacts well with her. Before leaving, Sam suggests Buck have Molly tested for eligibility for a program where he now works, as he suspects it could help her connect with the world.

Molly's neurologist, Susan Brookes, suggests an experimental surgery in which genetically modified brain cells are implanted into Molly's brain. While Buck initially balks at the suggestion, he finally consents to the surgery. Soon after, Molly suffers a seizure, upsetting her brother, as she almost died. When Susan suggests another try, Buck refuses.

Some days later, after seeing Molly understand some abstract concepts, Buck creates a list of simple learning goals for Molly. One morning, he wakes up to find Molly is able to do many of the tasks on it. Enthusiastic, Buck takes her back to Dr. Brookes, and she makes a gradual but miraculous recovery, speaking fluidly and interacting with others in a normal way.

Buck begins taking Molly to social events, like a production of Romeo and Juliet, a baseball game and fancy dinners. However, after a few months, Molly's brain begins to reject the transplanted cells, and she begins to regress into her previous state. Both Molly and Buck must accept the eventual loss of Molly's cure and her regression into her previous state.

Near the end of the film, Buck accepts Molly's autism and vows to remain in her life by creating a room for her at his home that looks just like the room she had at the institution. The film closes with Buck taking Molly out on his finished sailboat. What began as his solo escape project has become a symbol of their shared journey, signaling his growth from an isolated bachelor into a dedicated brother ready to navigate life alongside her.

== Cast ==
- Elisabeth Shue as Molly McKay
  - Lauren Richter as 7-year-old Molly McKay
- Aaron Eckhart as Buck McKay
  - Tanner Lee Prairie as 8-year-old Buck McKay
- Jill Hennessy as Susan Brookes
- Thomas Jane as Sam
- D. W. Moffett as Mark Cottrell
- Elizabeth Mitchell as Beverly Trehare
- Robert Harper as Dr. Simmons
- Elaine Hendrix as Jennifer Thomas
- Michael Paul Chan as Domingo
- Lucy Liu as Brenda
- Jon Pennell as Gary McKay
- Sarah Wynter as Julie McKay
- Jay Acovone as Jack, The Bartender

== Release ==
Believing the film was unlikely to be a success, the distributors Metro-Goldwyn-Mayer Pictures chose to cut their losses and eliminate the film's marketing budget. It was first released on airplanes before being released to theaters. It was only released on a single weekend in twelve theaters, in order to meet legal obligations, and grossed only US$17,650 during its theatrical run, on a budget of $21 million, making it a box office bomb.

=== Critical reception ===
Molly was widely panned by critics.On the review aggregator website Rotten Tomatoes, 13% of 23 critics' reviews are positive. The website's consensus reads: "Molly never really elevates above uninspired, cliche-ridden moments." Metacritic, which uses a weighted average, assigned the film a score of 21 out of 100, based on 10 critics, indicating "generally unfavorable" reviews.
