= Howard Leeds =

American television producer

- Born: Howard Michael Leeds; June 27, 1919; Winnipeg, Manitoba, Canada
- Died: February 11, 2017 (aged 97); Los Angeles, California, U.S.
- Occupations: Television producer, screenwriter, creator
- Years active: 1952–1989
- Notable work: Diff'rent Strokes (producer/writer); The Facts of Life (producer/co-creator); Silver Spoons (producer/co-creator); Small Wonder (executive producer/creator)
- Spouse: Joan Hajny (?-2017, his death)
- Children: John

Howard Michael Leeds (June 27, 1919 – February 11, 2017) was a Canadian-American television producer, writer, and series creator. Among Leeds' most notable work, he served as a producer and writer for the ABC sitcom, The Brady Bunch, and worked on several television series for Norman Lear's Tandem Productions/Embassy Television, including co-creating NBC's The Facts of Life and Silver Spoons. Leeds also served as the creator and executive producer of the syndicated 1980s family sitcom, Small Wonder.

== Life and career ==
Leeds was born on June 27, 1919, in Winnipeg, Manitoba, and as a youth, he and his family re-located to Los Angeles, California. Leeds graduated from Fairfax High School in 1938, and later enlisted in the United States Army during World War II, rising to the rank of sergeant before being honorably discharged in 1946. Upon returning to Los Angeles after his Army service, Leeds worked in a variety of jobs at MGM Studios before becoming a writer on several early television series. He worked as a writer on The Red Skelton Hour and The George Gobel Show, and also wrote for other 1950s and '60s situation comedies such as The Tennessee Ernie Ford Show, Bachelor Father, My Three Sons, Bewitched, and The Ghost & Mrs. Muir, the latter of which he also served as a producer. In 1969, Leeds created his first television series, a short-lived CBS sitcom, The Queen & I. After The Brady Bunch concluded production for good in 1974, Leeds joined Tandem Productions as a writer and producer for several of their series, including first working on the Sanford and Son spinoff, Grady, and then became one of the lead producers of the NBC sitcom Diff'rent Strokes, when the series debuted in 1978.

Along with veteran writer/producer Ben Starr, they both went on to create the aforementioned Facts of Life (with Ben Starr and Jerry Mayer) and Silver Spoons (with Martin Cohan). In 1985, Leeds created and executive produced Small Wonder, a syndicated family sitcom that was produced by Metromedia Producers Corporation (later by 20th Century Fox Television) about a robotics engineer (Dick Christie) and his family raising a robot as a female pre-adolescent (Tiffany Brissette), and was his last known credited work; in the mid-1960s, Leeds was the producer of a sitcom with a slightly similar premise, titled My Living Doll, starring Bob Cummings and Julie Newmar, in which the latter portrayed a lifelike adult android under the care of Cummings' character.

From 1976 to 1978, Leeds also worked as a production executive for Reg Grundy Productions.

== Death ==
Leeds died on February 11, 2017, in his Los Angeles home, after a long illness, according to his family. He is survived by his wife, Joan, son John, and two granddaughters.
