= Ferris Bueller (TV series) =

American sitcom (1990–1991)

- Genre: Sitcom
- Based on: Ferris Bueller's Day Off by John Hughes
- Developed by: John Masius
- Starring: Charlie Schlatter; Brandon Douglas; Ami Dolenz; Jennifer Aniston; Richard Riehle; Cristine Rose; Sam Freed
- Composer: Glenn A. Jordan
- Country of origin: United States
- Original language: English
- No. of seasons: 1
- No. of episodes: 13

Production
- Executive producer: John Masius
- Producers: Michael J. Di Gaetano; Lawrence Gay; Pamela Grant; Frank Pace
- Cinematography: Stephen C. Confer
- Editors: Darryl Bates; Robert Bramwell
- Camera setup: Single-camera
- Running time: 30 minutes
- Production companies: Maysh, Ltd. Productions; Paramount Television

Original release
- Network: NBC
- Release: August 23, 1990 – August 11, 1991

Related
- Ferris Bueller's Day Off

Ferris Bueller is an American sitcom television series based on the 1986 John Hughes film Ferris Bueller's Day Off. The show stars Charlie Schlatter in the title role. The series debuted on August 23, 1990, on NBC and was canceled within its first season, a few months after its debut with only 13 episodes aired, due to its poor reception. The show was produced by Maysh, Ltd. Productions in association with Paramount Television. Hughes was not involved in the show's production.

== Synopsis ==
Though based on the film, the series was not a canon continuation but is claimed in the first episode to portray the "real life" situations that inspired the film. Ferris (Schlatter) expresses his displeasure at being portrayed by Matthew Broderick, a cardboard cutout of whom he destroys with a chainsaw, although the series makes no later references to the film. The series focuses on Ferris Bueller and his high school experiences at Ocean Park High, including dealing with his best friend Cameron (Brandon Douglas), love interest Sloane (Ami Dolenz), and sister Jeannie (Jennifer Aniston). The series is set in Santa Monica, as opposed to the film's setting of Chicago.

Ferris is liked by everyone as the "cool guy on campus". He is extremely popular, suave, and quick-witted and is a master of ceremonies who often breaks the fourth wall. Cameron is still a depressive neurotic who, through Ferris, is able to loosen up occasionally. Compared to the film, Sloane is not completely wrapped around Ferris's finger and has to be won over at times. Ed Rooney is the primary antagonist and always out to get Ferris but usually ends up foiled or humiliated. His secretary, Grace, is not a wise-cracking sarcastic, but a passive pushover with an unreciprocated crush on Ed.

Jeannie is constantly at odds with Ferris and his being favored by all. Though she can be antagonistic, she proves to be begrudgingly copacetic. Ferris is a junior and Jeannie is a senior, switching their grades from the movie, while Mr. and Mrs. Bueller's names are Barbara and Bill, as opposed to Katie and Tom.

== Cast ==
The main cast

=== Starring ===
- Charlie Schlatter as Ferris Bueller
- Richard Riehle as Principal Ed Rooney
- Sam Freed as Bill Bueller
- Jennifer Aniston as Jeannie Bueller
- Ami Dolenz as Sloane Peterson
- Brandon Douglas as Cameron Frye
- Judith Kahan as Grace
- Cristine Rose as Barbara Bueller

=== Recurring ===
- Jeff Maynard as Arthur Petrelli
- Jerry Tullos as Mr. Rickets
- David Glasser as Dork
- Brandon Rane as Wimp
- Chris Claridge as Student #2/Surfer/Tim
- Bojesse Christopher as Greaser
- Jim DeMarse as Mr. Prescott/Mr. Tenser

=== Guest ===
- Jane Lynch as Mrs. Tenser
- Cloris Leachman as Ferris and Jean's grandmother
- Carla Gugino as Ann Peyson, Cameron's girlfriend

== Episodes ==
No.	Title	Directed by	Written by	Original release date	Viewers (millions)
1	"Pilot"	Jonathan Lynn	John Masius	August 23, 1990	22.9
The first day of Ferris Bueller's junior year begins at Ocean Bay High School. He has some old issues to deal with, such as his arch nemesis Principal Rooney. That will have to wait as he has the new issue of a beautiful transfer student named Sloan.
2	"Behind Every Dirtbag"	Bill Bixby	Michael J. Digaetano & Lawrence Gay	September 17, 1990	15.7
Principal Rooney handpicks a candidate for student-body president and prohibits Ferris from running. Ferris does the next best thing and prepares his own candidate. His choice is a boy named Shred who dislikes Principal Rooney as much as he does. However, when Sloan gets to know Shred, she remakes his image from a greaser into a well-dressed preppy, causing Ferris to worry she is interested in him more than just leadership.
3	"Custodian of the People"	Beth Rooney Hillshafer	Rob Ulin	September 24, 1990	16.0
Ferris and Sloan have hit a bump in the road in their new relationship. Ferris makes the mistake of being unsupportive of Sloan's ambition of becoming a dancer. Ferris is also at odds again with Principal Rooney as he convinces Lou, the new janitor, to impersonate the new dean of students, a former Marine drill Sergeant.
4	"Without You I'm Nothing"	Steve Dubin	Steve Pepoon	October 1, 1990	17.0
Cameron feels trapped in Ferris's shadow. Ferris attempts to help his friend by suggesting to him that he should do something he will be remembered for. Cameron takes his advice by pulling a dangerous stunt.
5	"Between a Rock and Rooney's Place"	James Whitmore Jr.	Paul B. Price	October 8, 1990	19.9
Sloan wants to throw a small and peaceful surprise party for Cameron's birthday. Ferris has other plans and they include many people, a rapper (Tone Lōc, and Principal Rooney's house.
6	"A Dog and His Boy"	Victor Lobl	John Masius	October 15, 1990	18.9
Ferris is still trying to win Sloan's love so when she asks him to watch the school mascot he agrees. Principal Rooney sees the dog with Ferris and gets rid of it by calling the dogcatcher.
7	"Ferris Bueller Can't Win"	Steve Dubin	Mary Conley	October 22, 1990	15.8
The San Diego Chicken makes an appearance at Ocean Bay High School, which kicks off a run of bad luck for Ferris. He gets in a fight with Sloan and Cameron accidentally destroys his homework. To top it all off an earthquake hits while he is riding in an elevator with his archenemy Principal Rooney, trapping them both.
8	"Sloan Again, Naturally"	Andy Tennant	Kathy Slevin	November 5, 1990	16.4
Ferris and Jeannie set their differences aside and work together to ruin a date between Sloan and the new exchange student from Italy. Ferris wants Sloan back and Jeannie wants the exchange student for herself.
9	"Scenes from a Grandma"	Arlene Sanford	Michael J. Digaetano & Lawrence Gay & Steve Pepoon & Rob Ulin	November 12, 1990	19.8
Ferris's nosy, know-it-all grandmother wants to turn her two-week visit into a permanent stay, and gets a job as a counselor at his school.
10	"Stand-In Deliver"	Bethany Rooney	Andy Tennant	November 26, 1990	16.6
The father of Cameron's new girlfriend Ann forbids Cameron from seeing her. Ferris poses as her boyfriend to get past her father. Complications arise when Cameron's girlfriend falls for Ferris.
11	"Baby You Can't Drive My Car"	Bill Bixby	Steve Pepoon	December 3, 1990	17.5
Ferris gets the car of his dreams for his birthday, a 1962 Chevy Corvette. His dreams turn into nightmares when he and Cameron become concerned that the car is haunted. Ferris returns to talk to the car salesman, Mr. McFarland, and discovers that Mr. McFarland has been dead for over 20 years.
12	"Grace Under Pressure"	Victor Lobl	Rob Ulin	December 16, 1990	8.3
Principal Rooney cancels "Beach Day" when he hears that Superintendent Weldon has planned an inspection. Ferris has been looking forward to the event and decides to secretly go ahead with the plans.
13	"A Night in the Life"	Christopher T. Welch	Evan Smith	August 11, 1991	4.7
Ferris and Cameron survive an eventful night while trying to churn out an important class paper.

== Reception and cancellation ==
Compared to the film, the show received mostly negative reviews from critics. It also suffered from comparisons to another series, Parker Lewis Can't Lose, which proved to be more successful when it came to ratings, lasting for three seasons. Ratings for a Ferris "sneak preview" were strong, but ratings for the actual series were much lower. In an October 5, 1990 interview, NBC executive Warren Littlefield said the show was already in danger of cancellation, and could be pulled from the schedule as soon as the ratings for episode 4 came in. The series was canceled due to poor viewership and low ratings after one season, airing a total of thirteen episodes.
