= Troop Beverly Hills =

1989 film by Jeff Kanew

- Theatrical release poster
- Directed by: Jeff Kanew
- Screenplay by: Pamela Norris; Margaret Grieco Oberman
- Story by: Ava Ostern Fries
- Produced by: Ava Ostern Fries
- Starring: Shelley Long; Craig T. Nelson; Betty Thomas; Mary Gross; Stephanie Beacham
- Cinematography: Donald E. Thorin
- Edited by: Mark Melnick
- Music by: Randy Edelman
- Production companies: Weintraub Entertainment Group; Fries Entertainment; Avanti
- Distributed by: Columbia Pictures
- Release date: March 24, 1989
- Running time: 106 minutes
- Country: United States
- Language: English
- Budget: $18 million
- Box office: $8.5 million

Troop Beverly Hills is a 1989 American adventure comedy film directed by Jeff Kanew and starring Shelley Long, Craig T. Nelson, Betty Thomas, Mary Gross, Stephanie Beacham, and Jenny Lewis in her film debut. The film features a host of young actors, including Ami Foster, Carla Gugino, Kellie Martin, Emily Schulman, and Tori Spelling.

The film follows Beverly Hills housewife Phyllis Nefler (Long) as she decides to become the leader of a local troop of Wilderness Girls to help maintain a relationship with her daughter during a divorce. Phyllis becomes an unlikely den mother to the girls, who are not taken seriously by other troops. When Phyllis falls afoul of a rival troop leader, the girls face the possibility of having their group dissolved—unless they can prove their wilderness skills at the annual Jamboree.

Though the film was not a financial success during its release and received negative critical reception, it has since acquired a cult following as a 1980s children's film with a feminist message.

== Plot ==
Phyllis Nefler is a socialite recently separated from her husband Freddy, whom she supported through law school but who never actually became a lawyer, instead becoming the wealthy owner of a chain of auto shops. In an attempt to maintain the relationship with her daughter Hannah during the contentious divorce, Phyllis becomes the den mother of Hannah's unruly, leaderless local Girl Scout troop of Wilderness Girls.

Their first campout results in the troop getting caught in a rainstorm, prompting Phyllis to take the girls to "camp out" at the Beverly Hills Hotel. Despite her lack of wilderness skills, Phyllis demonstrates an unwavering commitment to the girls' well-being and becomes a surrogate mother to the troop. She resolves to teach the girls how to survive in "the wilds of Beverly Hills", even customizing new merit badges for her troop.

Phyllis' unorthodox methods run afoul of another scout leader, Velda Plendor, a strict, mean-spirited, retired army nurse who runs the militant Culver City "Red Feathers", which includes her own daughter Cleo. As commander-in-chief of the district, Velda has considerable influence at the regional council level, and declares Phyllis' customized merit badges ineligible. Velda sends her assistant troop leader Annie Herman to infiltrate Troop Beverly Hills and sabotage them. Velda and Annie's attempts at sabotage prove unsuccessful, as Velda's superior and regional council leader Frances Temple states that while Phyllis may have unusual methods, she has taken an active interest in these girls and is trying to help them learn to survive their personal environment.

Troop Beverly Hills can gain recognition from the regional council by passing a series of tests at the upcoming annual Jamboree. In order to qualify, the troop needs to sell 1,000 boxes of cookies. To prevent this, Velda one-ups Troop Beverly Hills by selling cookies in their own neighborhood. Annie severs ties with Velda and sides with Phyllis. The Troop ends up selling over 4,000 boxes of cookies, more than enough to qualify for the Jamboree. At a party for the Troop, Velda takes her anger out on Annie by threatening her with a job at Kmart; Annie snaps back, standing up to her superior for the first time.

Meanwhile, Phyllis reconnects with Freddy, who tells her he is proud she has accomplished something. However, Phyllis soon learns that Freddy still wants to proceed with the divorce, including seeking joint custody of Hannah, which devastates Phyllis. Velda demoralizes Phyllis further by claiming that her previous fun-loving attitude with the Troop will only endanger them at the Jamboree. She decides to disband the troop, but Hannah and the other girls change her mind, telling Phyllis she has given them a new sense of self-esteem.

At the Jamboree, the Red Feathers trick Troop Beverly Hills during the competition by misdirecting them into a snake-infested swamp. Luckily, a skunk scares them into running through a shortcut, making them first in the qualifying event. The next day, Velda cheats again by cutting a rope bridge after her troop crosses and by leading them into a restricted area used only for hunting. However, Velda falls and breaks her ankle. The Red Feathers, now led by Cleo, abandon Velda for the sake of winning. Troop Beverly Hills repairs the bridge and finds Velda. The girls reluctantly carry her to the finish line after Phyllis reminds them of being considerate to those in need—especially a fellow Wilderness Girl.

Though the Red Feathers cross the finish line first, they are disqualified because council law stipulates the leader must be with the troop. Troop Beverly Hills is declared the winner of the Jamboree and is recognized as Wilderness Girls. Frances fires Velda for cheating and for placing the Troop Beverly Hills girls in jeopardy, as well as finally tiring of her overall rude and entitled behavior. Phyllis and Freddy kiss and profess their love for each other, with Freddy proposing remarriage.

The next year, Troop Beverly Hills is the designated Poster Troop. Meanwhile, Velda is forced to take a job as a cashier at Kmart, where she makes a store-wide announcement about cookies.

== Cast ==
- Shelley Long as Phyllis Nefler, a Beverly Hills socialite and the new leader of Wilderness Girls Troop Beverly Hills
- Craig T. Nelson as Freddy Nefler, Phyllis' estranged entrepreneur husband and Hannah's father
- Betty Thomas as Velda Plendor, the ruthless leader of a rival troop who wants to get rid of Troop Beverly Hills
- Mary Gross as Annie Herman, Velda's assistant and spy, and later Phyllis' assistant
- Stephanie Beacham as Vicki Sprantz, Claire's mother, a romance novelist, and Phyllis' friend
- Audra Lindley as Frances Temple, the head leader of the Wilderness Girls of America's Southern California division who is undermined by Velda
- Edd Byrnes as Ross Coleman, Emily's father and an unemployed actor
- Ami Foster as Claire Sprantz, a child actress and the daughter of a romance novelist and a successful lawyer
- Carla Gugino as Chica Barnfell, a stern girl who is often left alone by her jet-setting parents
- Heather Hopper as Tessa DiBlasio, the daughter of a well-known film director, and in many ways a genius who has learned a bit too much from her therapist
- Kellie Martin as Emily Coleman, the daughter of an unemployed actor
- Emily Schulman as Tiffany Honigman, the daughter of a prominent Beverly Hills plastic surgeon
- Tasha Scott as Jasmine Shakar, the outspoken daughter of a well-known boxer
- Aquilina Soriano as Lily Marcigan, the daughter of Dictator Bong Bong and Karina (based on Ferdinand and Imelda Marcos, respectively) who rule an unspecified Southeast Asian country
- Jenny Lewis as Hannah Nefler, Phyllis and Freddy's daughter who just wants her mother to lead like a normal troop leader. She is also a skilled gymnast.
- David Gautreaux as Mr. DiBlasio, Tessa's father and a film director
- Karen Kopins as Lisa, Freddy Nefler's realtor and new fiancée
- Dinah Lacey as Cleo Plendor, Velda's daughter and a member of the Culver City Red Feathers
- Shelley Morrison as Rosa, Phyllis' housekeeper who helps out with the troop
- David Wohl as Dr. Honigman, a plastic surgeon
- Tori Spelling as Jamie, Cleo's friend and troopmate who helps sabotage Troop Beverly Hills
- Dan Ziskie as Arthur Barnfell, Chica's father
- Kareem Abdul-Jabbar as himself
- Frankie Avalon as himself
- Dr. Joyce Brothers as herself
- Annette Funicello as herself
- Willie Garson as Bruce
- Mary Pat Gleason as a kindly troop leader
- Robin Leach as himself
- Cheech Marin as himself
- Ted McGinley as himself
- Jo Marie Payton-France as a saleswoman
- Hilary Shepard as a salesgirl
- Pia Zadora as herself

== Production ==
The film is inspired by producer Ava Ostern Fries' experiences running her daughter's Girl Scout troop.

Principal photography began in Los Angeles on May 31, 1988. All exterior locations were filmed in Beverly Hills, aside from several sequences shot in Malibu State Park. Many landmarks in Beverly Hills are seen throughout the film, including Rodeo Drive, the Beverly Hills Hotel, Wolfgang Puck's Spago, Jane Fonda's Workout, and Cartier. Filming also took place on Sunset Boulevard. Various celebrities, including Kareem Abdul-Jabbar and Cheech Marin, make cameo appearances in the film.

The film's animated opening credits, set to "Make It Big" by The Beach Boys, was produced by what would later become Spümcø, with the involvement of animators John Kricfalusi, Lynne Naylor, Bob Camp and Jim Smith. The sequence's art style is reminiscent of The Ren & Stimpy Show, for which all four worked on; it was received substantially more positively for its high quality.

== Reception ==
Troop Beverly Hills was poorly received by critics during its release. On the review aggregator website Rotten Tomatoes, 14% of 28 critics' reviews are positive, with an average rating of 4.3/10. The website's consensus reads: "Troop Beverly Hills is hamstrung by a one-joke premise, leaving this Shelley Long comedy woefully short on laughs." Metacritic, which uses a weighted average, assigned the film a score of 32 out of 100, based on 11 critics, indicating "generally unfavorable" reviews. Audiences surveyed by CinemaScore gave the film an average grade of "B" on a scale of A+ to F.

Roger Ebert criticized the film for not being the "merciless evisceration of the lifestyles of the rich" that he expected, but instead more of a morality story arc for Shelley Long's character. Some reviews lambasted the script for its formulaic underdog story, with The Washington Post's Rita Kempley chiding the film for its attempt to cast Beverly Hills youth in the underdog role. "Pity the poor little Beverlies: Children from lower income groups laugh at their Giorgio boutique backpacks. Then Velda strips the girls of the badges they've earned for facials and pricing jewelry. She further derides them for holding their camp-out at the Beverly Hills Hotel, where they tell horror stories about bad haircuts."

Some critics called attention to Long's comedic performance as one of the film's strengths. Janet Maslin of The New York Times wrote, "Troop Beverly Hills is a one-idea movie, and the idea isn't new. But it isn't threadbare either, thanks to the indefatigable pluck of Shelley Long, who plays a spiritual sister to Private Benjamin". However, Gene Siskel of the Chicago Tribune called the film "a limp copy of Private Benjamin" and said that "Long is no [Goldie] Hawn when it comes to comedy."

In the years since its release, the film has become a cult classic for its subtle feminist message and being illustrative of the 1980s, having gained newer audiences through repeat airings on Disney Channel in the 1990s. Writing for Elle in 2014, Elissa Strauss contended the film's sympathy for its young protagonists, its refusal "to reduce the characters and setting down to a punch line", and an "unrestrained celebration of girliness, glorious girliness" are precisely what has helped the film endure as a classic.

In a retrospective piece for Birth.Movies.Death, Ashlee Blackwell wrote:

In the end, it's the troop's persistence and support of each other, even in moments of doubt, that carries them to a win at the climatic Wilderness Jamboree competition…Troop Beverly Hills thoughtfully exposes the complexities of divorce, social/class culture and personal growth in a light comedy very much loyal to its time. The film tampers with audience expectations of people with money, blurring the lines of good/bad, rich/not rich. Troop Beverly Hills dared to tell young girls (and women) to never compromise the best of yourself for people or things…Even with its blemishes, Troop Beverly Hills' heart was always in the right place. What a thrill.

== In popular culture ==
In the music video for her 2015 song "She's Not Me", Jenny Lewis, who played Hannah in the film, reference the film as part of her roles as a child actor. In the video, Lewis and actors Zosia Mamet, Vanessa Bayer, and Leo Fitzpatrick wear the Troop Beverly Hills uniforms.

== Sequel ==
In April 2026, it was announced that Cameron Diaz would star in and produce a sequel to the film, which will be written and directed by Clea DuVall for Columbia's sister company TriStar Pictures.
