= The Children of Times Square =

1986 crime drama film

- Genre: Crime; Drama
- Written by: Curtis Hanson
- Directed by: Curtis Hanson
- Starring: Howard E. Rollins Jr. Joanna Cassidy; David Ackroyd; Larry B. Scott; Danny Nucci; Brandon Douglas
- Music by: Michael Shrieve
- Country of origin: United States
- Original language: English

Production
- Executive producer: Charles W. Fries
- Producers: Marcy Gross; Ann Weston
- Production locations: New York City; Los Angeles
- Cinematography: Robert Elswit
- Editor: Ray Daniels
- Running time: 94 minutes
- Production company: Fries Entertainment

Original release
- Network: ABC
- Release: March 3, 1986

The Children of Times Square is a 1986 American made-for-television crime drama film directed by Curtis Hanson. The film is about an alienated teenager who runs away from home and travels to New York City where he falls in with a cocaine dealer using street children as drug dealers. It aired on ABC on March 3, 1986.

== Plot ==
14-year-old Eric lives with his divorced mother Sue in Pennsylvania. Feeling unwanted by his stepfather Peter, Eric runs away to New York City. He ends up in Times Square where he meets up with Luis, a Hispanic youth looking to help his mother and kid sisters make ends meet after losing their apartment to a fire. Luis introduces Eric to Skater, who brings him into a gang of street kids who work as drug runners for a cocaine dealer named Otis. Drawn to the allure of what looks like easy money, Eric and Luis go to work for Otis, but find themselves sinking deeper into a world of gang violence and crime. Meanwhile, Sue drives to Manhattan in search of her son, frantically ignoring police advice to search around Times Square.

== Cast ==
- Howard E. Rollins Jr. as Otis Talbot
- Joanna Cassidy as Sue Roberts
- David Ackroyd as Peter Roberts
- Brandon Douglas as Eric Roberts
- Larry B. Scott as Skater
- Jason Bernard as Lieutenant Devins
- Danny Nucci as Luis Sotavento
- Silvana Gallardo as Lizette Sotavento, Luis' Mother
- De'voreaux White as C.J.
- Griffin O'Neal as Rick
- Mars Callahan as Brian
- Jacob Vargas as Alberto
- Robert Roman as Trini
- Joe Spinell as Street Vendor
- Annie Oringer as Debbie
- Yasmine Delawari as Carla
- Terry Wills as David, Business Man #1
- R.D. Call as Walter, Rival Boss

== Critical reception ==
John J. O'Connor of The New York Times wrote "As The Children of Times Square skips from scene to scene, it becomes increasingly clear that the film is more interested in a bit of sensationalism here, a dab of standard violence there." He said the film comes close to being pure exploitation, adding, "For some impressionable youths, it might even serve as an advertisement for alternative styles of life."

Diane Holloway of the Austin American-Statesman said, "Rollins is terrific as the slimy Otis, and Cassidy is heartbreaking as the distraught but determined mother. In fact, there is little fault to be found with anyone in the cast", but said the film doesn't rise above standard after school special material and has an implausible ending.

== Home media ==
The film was released on DVD in Region 1 NTSC Format on June 25, 2012 via MGM's Limited Edition Collection.

It has also been made available for digital purchase on Amazon Prime Video.
