= Ace Crawford, Private Eye =

- Genre: Mystery; Comedy
- Created by: Ron Clark & Tim Conway
- Directed by: Michael Preece; Charles S. Dubin
- Starring: Tim Conway; Joe Regalbuto
- Theme music composer: Hughie Cannon; Peter Matz
- Country of origin: United States
- Original language: English
- No. of seasons: 1
- No. of episodes: 5

Production
- Camera setup: Multi-camera
- Running time: 30 minutes
- Production companies: Conway Enterprises; Viacom Productions

Original release
- Network: CBS
- Release: March 15 – April 12, 1983

Ace Crawford, Private Eye is an American sitcom that aired on CBS from March 15 to April 12, 1983. The series parodied the "hard-boiled detective" genre.

== Synopsis ==
Tim Conway stars as a trench-coated private investigator who always solves the case and catches the bad guy, despite his constant bumbling. The show was broadcast on Tuesdays at 8 p.m. ET. Only five episodes aired.

== Cast and characters ==
- Tim Conway as Ace Crawford, Private Eye
- Joe Regalbuto as Toomey, a CPA and Crawford's assistant; he always saw Crawford as a hero, and thought that his bumbling was simply some kind of cunning strategy
- Billy Barty as Inch, owner and bartender of The Shanty, a wharfside bar where Crawford hangs out
- Shera Danese as Luana, a singer at The Shanty who lusted after Crawford
- Bill Henderson as Mello, a blind jazz musician at The Shanty
- Dick Christie as Detective Lieutenant Fanning, who was always mystified as to how Crawford solved every case

== Format ==
In each half-hour episode, Crawford would be hired for, or otherwise find himself involved in, a case in which criminals were taking advantage of innocent citizens. He would then approach the case using Conway's trademark comedy style; in one episode he was disguised as a feeble old man, in another he was using a children's toy microphone as a "wire." In spite of the slapstick results of his actions, Crawford would always emerge triumphant.

Every episode ended the same way: Crawford would leave The Shanty at night and walk along the wharf, vanishing into the fog... and then audibly fall into the water.

Each episode was on film (as opposed to videotape), and had a laugh track.

== Episodes ==
No.	Title	Directed by	Written by	Original release date
1	"Murder at Restful Hills"	Michael Preece	Ron Friedman	March 15, 1983
Ace investigates the claim of Luana's grandmother that deaths at a nursing home weren't the result of natural causes.
2	"Bull Bates"	Charles S. Dubin	Ron Clark, Tim Conway	March 22, 1983
Deedee, the girlfriend of gangster Bull Bates, gives to Ace a book detailing everyone that Bates has rubbed out.
3	"Inch in a Pinch"	Michael Preece	Arnie Kogen	March 29, 1983
Ace sets a trap for a merciless mobster when his bartender friend Inch is beaten up by thugs.
4	"The Microchip Caper"	Michael Preece	Rudy De Luca	April 5, 1983
Ace finds himself in the middle of a multi-million dollar con when he is hired to test a computer company's plant security.
5	"The Gentleman Bandit"	Michael Preece	Mickey Rose	April 12, 1983
Ace goes undercover as a secretary to nab a thief who is preying on a magazine's female employees.

== Home media ==
In 1989, a VHS videocassette was released containing the first three episodes. In August 2020, Shout! Factory TV acquired complete streaming rights.
