= Brandon Douglas =

American actor

- Born: Brandon Sokolosky; June 21, 1968 (age 58); Oklahoma City, Oklahoma, United States
- Occupation: Actor
- Years active: 1985–2005; 2014
- Spouse(s): Julie Condra (1992–1995; divorced); Danielle Raciti
- Children: 2

Brandon Sokolosky (born June 21, 1968), known professionally as Brandon Douglas, is an American actor. He first came to prominence in the television series Falcon Crest, in which he played Ben Agretti during the 1988–1989 season. He played Wayne Jones in an episode of the TV series Northern Exposure and Dr. Andrew Cook in the series Dr. Quinn, Medicine Woman. Other credits include 21 Jump Street, Matlock, Murder, She Wrote, and JAG. He co-starred as Cameron in the television sitcom Ferris Bueller.

Douglas played the lead in The Children of Times Square, a 1986 TV movie directed by Curtis Hanson. He also starred in Papa Was a Preacher (1985).

Douglas was born Brandon Sokolosky in Oklahoma City, Oklahoma and raised in Dallas, Texas. He previously was married to actress Julie Condra.
