= Barret Oliver =

American actor and photographer

- Born: Barret Spencer Oliver; August 24, 1973 (age 53); Los Angeles, California, U.S.
- Occupations: Actor (formerly); photographer
- Years active: 1981–1989
- Awards: Saturn Award (1986)

Barret Spencer Oliver (born August 24, 1973) is an American photographer and a former child actor. He is best known for his role as Bastian Balthazar Bux in the film adaptation of Michael Ende's novel The Neverending Story, followed by roles in D.A.R.Y.L., Cocoon, and Cocoon: The Return.

== Career ==
Oliver had minor roles in television and film, until starring as Bastian in the 1984 movie The NeverEnding Story. Subsequently, he was cast as the lead in Tim Burton's short film Frankenweenie and as the cyborg "Daryl" in the 1985 film D.A.R.Y.L., a part for which he won a Saturn Award.

His last role in a feature film was Willie Saravian in Paul Bartel's 1989 ensemble comedy Scenes from the Class Struggle in Beverly Hills.

Later Oliver became a printer and photographer, specializing in nineteenth-century processes such as collodion and Woodburytype. His work has been displayed in museum and gallery exhibitions and used in films. In 2007, his book A History of the Woodburytype was published by Carl Mautz Publishing.

== Personal life ==
Oliver was a member of Scientology, but his current affiliation is unclear.

== Filmography ==
=== Film ===
Year	Title	Role	Notes
1982	Jekyll and Hyde...Together Again	Child In Supermarket	Film debut
1982	Kiss Me Goodbye	Little Boy	
1982	The Circle Family	Q.P.	Television movie
1983	Uncommon Valor	Kid #2	
1984	The NeverEnding Story	Bastian	
1984	Invitation to Hell	Robbie Winslow	
1984	Frankenweenie	Victor Frankenstein	Short film
1985	D.A.R.Y.L.	Daryl	Saturn Award for Best Performance by a Younger Actor; Nominated—Young Artist Award for Best Young Actor in a Motion Picture
1985	Cocoon	David	
1986	Spot Marks the X	Ken Miller	Television movie
1987	The Secret Garden	Dickon Sowerby	Television movie
1988	Cocoon: The Return	David	
1989	Scenes from the Class Struggle in Beverly Hills	Willie Saravian	Final film

=== Television ===
Year	Title	Role	Notes
1981	The Incredible Hulk	Jimmy the Kid	Episode: "Veteran"
1982	Knight Rider	Buddy	Episode: "Knight of the Phoenix - Part 1 & 2"
1983	Love, Sidney	Unknown	Episode: "Surprise Party"
1984	Lottery!	Unknown	Episode: "San Diego - Bingo!"
1984	Highway to Heaven	Arthur Nealy	Episode: "To Touch the Moon"; Nominated—Young Artist Award for Best Young Guest Actor in a Television Series
1984	Finder of Lost Loves	Matthew Powell	Episode: "Portraits"
1986	The Twilight Zone	Georgie	Episode: "Gramma"
1987	Tall Tales & Legends	Hendrick Van Tassel	Episode: "The Legend of Sleepy Hollow"
1988	Hooperman	Anthony	Episode: "Me and Mr. Magoo"

== Awards and nominations ==
Year	Award	Work	Category	Result
1983	Young Artist Award	The Circle Family	Best Young Actor in a Television Special	Nominated
1985	Young Artist Award	Highway to Heaven	Best Young Actor - Guest in a Television Series	Nominated
1985	Young Artist Award	The NeverEnding Story	Best Young Actor in a Motion Picture - Musical, Comedy, Adventure or Drama	Nominated
1986	Young Artist Award	D.A.R.Y.L.	Best Starring Performance by a Young Actor - Motion Picture	Nominated
1986	Saturn Award for Best Performance by a Younger Actor	D.A.R.Y.L.	Best Performance by a Younger Actor	Won

== Bibliography ==
- Holmstrom, John. The Moving Picture Boy: An International Encyclopaedia from 1895 to 1995, Norwich, Michael Russell, 1996, pp. 393–394.
