= D.A.R.Y.L. =

1985 film by Simon Wincer

- Theatrical release poster
- Directed by: Simon Wincer
- Written by: David Ambrose; Allan Scott; Jeffrey Ellis
- Produced by: John Heyman
- Starring: Mary Beth Hurt; Michael McKean; Kathryn Walker; Colleen Camp; Josef Sommer; Barret Oliver
- Cinematography: Frank Watts
- Edited by: Adrian Carr
- Music by: Marvin Hamlisch
- Production company: World Film Services
- Distributed by: Paramount Pictures (United States); Columbia-EMI-Warner Distributors (United Kingdom)
- Release date: June 14, 1985
- Running time: 100 minutes
- Countries: United States; United Kingdom
- Language: English
- Budget: $10 million
- Box office: $7.8 million

D.A.R.Y.L. is a 1985 science fiction adventure film directed by Simon Wincer and written by David Ambrose, Allan Scott, and Jeffrey Ellis. It stars Mary Beth Hurt, Michael McKean, Kathryn Walker, Colleen Camp, Josef Sommer, and Barret Oliver. It follows a seemingly normal young boy who turns out to be a top secret, military-created robot with superhuman abilities.

The film was theatrically released in the United States and Canada on June 14, 1985, by Paramount Pictures and in the United Kingdom on June 20, 1985, by Columbia Pictures through Columbia-EMI-Warner Distributors. It received mixed reviews from critics and was a box-office bomb. For his performance, Oliver won the Saturn Award for Best Performance by a Younger Actor at the 13th Saturn Awards.

== Plot ==
A young boy is in a car with an older man being pursued by unknown forces. The man tells him to get out of the car, which crashes off a cliff. The boy wanders the forest barely aware of his surroundings. He is discovered by Mr. and Mrs. Bergen, an elderly couple, and taken to an orphanage in Barkenton, South Carolina. However, he has no memory of his true identity or why he was in the woods and only knows his name is Daryl. After being placed with his foster parents, Joyce and Andy Richardson, he begins to exhibit exceptional talents.

Daryl's social skills are limited due to his isolated upbringing, but he befriends Turtle Fox, his sarcastic and wisecracking neighbor. Daryl shares that he has amnesia and hopes his real parents will find him. As Daryl observes Turtle playing the video game Pole Position, he effortlessly outperforms him. He also does well in school, shocking a stern teacher by correctly correcting another student's work. Joyce feels disheartened, however, as Daryl, despite being pleasant, doesn't seem to need anything from her. Andy decides to teach Daryl social skills through baseball, where Daryl excels, hitting multiple home runs and impressing everyone except Joyce, who is not unkind but uninterested when Daryl excitedly tells her mid-game. Daryl wonders if he has hurt her somehow. Turtle advises Daryl that he is too perfect and to let Joyce help him a bit. Daryl then deliberately messes up the game and yells about it, allowing Joyce to comfort him.

Daryl gradually grows closer to his family and Turtle and loosens up, becoming more emotive. He also demonstrates his advanced capabilities when he helps Andy rectify an issue with an ATM and manipulates it to put more than one million dollars into his foster father's account.

During a baseball game, government agents Dr. Stewart and Dr. Lamb locate Daryl and present themselves as his real parents. They are surprised when the Richardsons show fondness for Daryl and say he is nervous to meet his parents. Andy has an emotional farewell in private where he encourages Daryl, who does not wish to leave, to give his parents a chance. After Daryl leaves, the Richardsons express doubt as to how unconcerned Daryl's "parents" seemed about him.

Dr. Stewart and Dr. Lamb reveal who they really are to Daryl as they return him to the TASCOM facility in Washington, D.C., where his memory is restored. Daryl "Data-Analyzing Robot Youth Lifeform" is an artificial intelligence experiment created by a government company called TASCOM. Daryl's brain is actually a highly advanced microcomputer with extraordinary abilities, including exceptional reflexes, multitasking skills, and the ability to hack computer systems. The experiment was intended to produce a super-soldier and was funded by the military, but one of the scientists involved in the project, Dr. Mulligan, became disillusioned and decided to free Daryl. Pursued by a helicopter, Dr. Mulligan sacrificed himself to ensure Daryl's escape, driving his car off a cliff.

Daryl undergoes debriefing, and his actions with his foster family are analyzed. He is questioned about why he threw the baseball game, and he reveals it was to relate to others. The scientists are also surprised at his new range of emotions, which he was not programmed for. Dr. Stewart is amazed while Dr. Lamb insists on referring to Daryl as it and says "it" is merely learning to copy behavior. Dr. Stewart, realizing he misses them, allows Andy, Joyce, and Turtle to visit over Dr. Lamb's protests. They convince them of Daryl's true nature, and it is revealed that his capacity for human emotions has led the project to be labeled a failure, leading to the decision to terminate him. Dr. Jeffrey Stewart, one of Daryl's creators, helps him escape, assisted by Dr. Lamb, who now questions Daryl's true nature.

Daryl and Dr. Stewart evade their pursuers with Daryl's driving skills. However, the next day, while trying to escape a roadblock, Dr. Stewart is shot and later dies from his injuries. That night, Daryl sneaks onto a military base and hijacks a Lockheed SR-71 Blackbird. Daryl contacts Turtle, instructing him and his sister Sherie Lee Fox to meet him at Blue Lake, a familiar location. The Air Force attempts to intercept the plane but fails. Daryl ejects to fake his death while the plane is destroyed. However, he lands unconscious in the lake and drowns. Daryl's body is rushed to the hospital but shows no signs of life.

Dr. Lamb discovers Daryl and reactivates his electronic brain, reviving him. With Daryl now declared dead, he is no longer pursued by TASCOM. He joyfully reunites with his foster family, bringing happiness to everyone, including Turtle, who believed Daryl could not die since he is a robot.

== Cast ==
- Mary Beth Hurt as Joyce Richardson, Daryl's adoptive mother
- Michael McKean as Andy Richardson, Daryl's adoptive father
- Kathryn Walker as Dr. Ellen Lamb
- Colleen Camp as Elaine Fox, Sherie Lee & Turtle's mother
- Josef Sommer as Dr. Jeffrey Stewart
- Steve Ryan as Howie Fox, Sherie Lee & Turtle's father
- Ron Frazier as General Graycliffe
- David Wohl as Mr. Nesbitt
- Danny Corkill as Turtle Fox, Sherie Lee's younger brother and Daryl's friend
- Amy Linker as Sherie Lee Fox, Turtle's older sister
- Barret Oliver as Daryl
- Ed L. Grady as Mr. Bergen
- Tucker McGuire as Mrs. Bergen
- Richard Hammatt as Dr. Mulligan
- Hardy Rawls as Bull McKenzie
- Robert Arden as Colonel
- James Fitzpatrick as Tascom Security Soldier

== Production ==
Principal photography began on January 2, 1985. The film was shot at Pinewood Studios (near London); Orlando, Florida; and Dillsboro, North Carolina.

Almost all of the fictional town of Barkenton was filmed in Orlando and the surrounding area, with one exception that was filmed in Dillsboro. Daryl's house was filmed at 716 Euclid Avenue in Orlando. Turtle's house was filmed at 717 Euclid Avenue in Orlando. Barkenton's city hall was filmed at 50 Front Street in Dillsboro. The hospital scenes were filmed at Orlando VA Medical Center. Blue Lake was filmed at Lake Copeland in Orlando. The baseball game at Barkenton Park was filmed at Delaney Park in Orlando. Barkenton School was filmed at Kaley School in Orlando. The group home scene was filmed at Great Oaks Village, boy's dorm east side.

The other locations in the movie were also filmed in Orlando. The exterior of the TASCOM facility was filmed at the Siemens Energy Inc. building in Orlando; The interiors were filmed at Pinewood Studios. Daryl's escape onto the freeway was filmed on SR 408 (East–West Expressway) and US 17 in Orlando. The airport scenes were filmed at Kissimmee Gateway Airport in Kissimmee. EPCOT Computer Central was used for the government laboratory scene.

== Reception ==
=== Box office ===
The film grossed $7,840,873 in the United States and Canada.

=== Critical response ===
On the review aggregator website Rotten Tomatoes, 50% of 18 critics' reviews are positive, with an average rating of 4.3/10.

Vincent Canby of The New York Times stated, "The best that can be said about D.A.R.Y.L. is that it's inoffensive" and "though D.A.R.Y.L. is not really bad, it's pretty silly. It might be more profitably shelved and some of the earlier films of its actors re-released."

Paul Attanasio of The Washington Post wrote, "The script is moronic and so riddled with improbabilities that the suspense element never takes root. Director Simon Wincer has no sense of pace or rhythm, but boy does he love to shoot helicopters and jet fighters, which whizz at the camera in great booming arcs. Well, it is noisy."

In his review for Entertainment Tonight, Leonard Maltin said, "This is one of the blandest movies I've seen all year. No punch. No surprises. No juice, especially in the way it's directed." On their show At the Movies, Gene Siskel gave D.A.R.Y.L. a "thumbs down" for being predictable and formulaic, while Roger Ebert recommended the movie, praising its ending and comparing its theme to that of the 1968 film Charly.

DVD Verdict cites "wooden" acting and a "preposterous" plot, but ultimately concludes that the film is "a formulaic slice of family entertainment that doesn't do much new, but follows the blueprint well enough to warrant a look."

== Legacy and cult status ==
In the decades since its release, D.A.R.Y.L. has undergone a critical reappraisal and developed a modest cult following, particularly among viewers who grew up in the 1980s. Although it was not commercially successful on release, the film gained popularity through cable television and home video. Fans often recall repeat viewings on VHS, and the film is remembered as a distinctive entry in the wave of family-friendly science fiction movies of the era.

In 2020, actor Tony Hale was announced as the star of a planned comedy sequel series for TBS, imagining Daryl as a 44-year-old android trying to live in the modern world. The show, developed by Paramount Television, was described as a continuation of the original film, reflecting its enduring fan appeal.

In a retrospective list from 2020, D.A.R.Y.L. was featured among the "12 Most Underrated 1980s Sci-Fi Movies" by WhatCulture, which praised the film for introducing real emotional stakes and darker moments than typically expected in children's entertainment.

In 2024, Taste of Cinema included D.A.R.Y.L. in its roundup of “The 10 Most Underrated Movies About Artificial Intelligence,” citing it as a family-friendly, emotionally resonant exploration of AI-human empathy.

The film's legacy was further solidified by boutique label Vinegar Syndrome's 2023 4K Ultra HD Blu-ray release, which included a new 55-minute documentary titled Rescued from the Scrapyard: The Making of D.A.R.Y.L., along with commentary by director Simon Wincer. The restoration was praised by genre fans and home video reviewers.

Blu-ray.com rated the restored release 4.5 out of 5, describing it as “a charming and well-executed relic of 1980s sci-fi storytelling.”

=== Accolades ===
Year	Award	Category	Recipient	Result
1985	7th Youth in Film Awards	Best Family Motion Picture - Adventure	D.A.R.Y.L.	Nominated
1985	7th Youth in Film Awards	Best Starring Performance by a Young Actor - Motion Picture	Barret Oliver	Nominated
1986	13th Saturn Awards	Best Performance by a Younger Actor	Barret Oliver	Won
