= Papa Was a Preacher =

1944 book by Alyene Porter

- First edition
- Author: Alyene Porter
- Language: English
- Publisher: Abingdon Press
- Publication date: 1944
- Publication place: United States

Papa Was a Preacher is a book written by Alyene Porter and published in 1944 by Abingdon Press. It was subsequently adapted into a stage play and a screenplay.
