= Tiffany Brissette =

American former child actress

- Occupations: Actress, nurse
- Years active: 1982–1991

Tiffany Brissette is an American former child actress. She is best known for her role as Vicki, the robot on the syndicated U.S. sitcom Small Wonder, which aired from 1985 to 1989.

== Career ==
Brissette first appeared in the 1983 film Heart Like a Wheel opposite Bonnie Bedelia and Beau Bridges. She then had a guest role on Webster before landing the role of V.I.C.I. the Robot in the syndicated series Small Wonder in 1985. After the series was canceled in 1989, Brissette continued acting, appearing in Parker Lewis Can't Lose as well as an unsold television pilot entitled Beanpole. In 1990, she voiced Wrenifred Brown the bird in the animated video Why Christmas Trees Aren't Perfect, which is based on the book of the same name and stars the voice talents of Jodi Benson, Tony Melendez, and Ray Benson. Her last professional acting role was in 1991 in Christopher Knopf's television series Equal Justice.

As of 2007, Brissette was working as a registered nurse in Boulder, Colorado.

== Filmography ==
Year	Title	Role	Notes
1982	A Woman Called Golda	Voice	TV movie
1982	Marco Polo		TV miniseries
1983	Heart Like a Wheel	Little Shirley	
1984	Caravan of Courage: An Ewok Adventure	Voice	TV movie Uncredited
1985	Webster	Kathy	2 episodes
1986	New Love, American Style		Episode: "Love and the Doll"
1985–1989	Small Wonder	Vicki the Robot	96 episodes
1987	The Adventures of Teddy Ruxpin	Safety Tips Officer (voice)	TV series
1988	Fox's Fun House	1 episode	
1990	Beanpole	Alice Gillette	TV pilot
1990–1991	Equal Justice	Katie Rogan	7 episodes
1990	Why Christmas Trees Aren't Perfect	Wrenifred Brown (voice)	Direct-to-video
1991	Parker Lewis Can't Lose	Annie Ricker	Episode: "Heather the Class"
1991	The 700 Club	Herself	Special Guest

== Award nominations ==
Year	Award	Category	Title of work
1985	Young Artist Award	Best Young Actress Starring in a New Television Series	Small Wonder
1986	Young Artist Award	Exceptional Performance by a Young Actress, Starring in a Television, Comedy or Drama Series	Small Wonder
1989	Young Artist Award	Best Young Actress in a Family Syndicated Show	Small Wonder
1990	Young Artist Award	Best Young Actress in an Off-Primetime Family Series	Small Wonder
