= Dick Christie =

American actor

- Born: Richard Leslie Christie; October 21, 1948 (age 77); Long Beach, California, U.S.
- Occupations: Actor, writer

Richard Leslie Christie (born October 21, 1948, in Long Beach, California) is an American actor. He is best known for portraying Ted Lawson on the 1980s sitcom Small Wonder.

In 1983 he appeared in the comedy series Ace Crawford, Private Eye alongside Tim Conway. He starred as Detective Lieutenant Fanning, who was always mystified as to how Crawford solved every case.

His other television credits include Who's the Boss?, Days of Our Lives, Hunter, Mama's Family, Knots Landing, Newhart, Hart to Hart, The Waltons, The Ropers and Breaking Bad. He also wrote the 1999 film Molly.

As of October 2013, he began playing the recurring role of Charlie Webber on the CBS daytime drama The Bold and the Beautiful.

== Filmography ==
Year	Title	Role	Notes
1979	The Last Word	Medic	Film
1979	The Ropers	Officer Hibbs	Episode: "Two for the Road"
1980	Eight is Enough	Salesman	Episode: "Semi-Centennial Bradford"
1980	Enola Gay: The Men, the Mission, the Atomic Bomb	Unknown	TV movie
1980	The Waltons	Sgt. Carey	Episode: "The Pledge"
1980	Any Which Way You Can	Jackson Officer	Film
1980	Honky Tonk Freeway	Auto Mechanic	Film
1980	Looker	Father	Film
1981	Hart to Hart	Lab Technician	Episode: "Hart of Darkness"
1982	Lois Gibbs and the Love Canal	Photographer	TV movie
1982	Mae West	Unknown	TV movie
1982	Newhart	Andy	Episode: "This Probably Is Condemned"
1983	Ace Crawford... Private Eye	Detective Lieutenant Fanning	Main role (5 episodes)
1984, 1985	Knots Landing	Chuck / Aide #2	2 episodes
1985–1989	Small Wonder	Ted Lawson	Main role (96 episodes) Writer (5 episodes) Director (3 episodes)
1989	Fire and Rain	First Officer Rudolph Price	TV movie
1989	Mama's Family	Mr Chetwind	Episode: "Mama Takes Stock"
1990	Days of Our Lives	Stanley Krakowski	6 episodes
1990	Hunter	Elliot Rogers	Episode: "Acapulco Holiday"
1991	Who's the Boss?	Ben	2 episodes
1993	The Cover Girl Murders	TV Host	TV movie
1999	Molly	Maitre D'	Film; also writer
2009	Breaking Bad	Stew	Episode: "ABQ"
2010	The Spy Next Door	Judge	Film
2010	Undocumented	Deputy (uncredited)	Film
2013–2025	The Bold and The Beautiful	Charlie Webber	Recurring role (221 episodes)
2014	50 to 1	Ben Huffman	Film
2016	Hell or High Water	Loan Officer	Film
2017	The 7 Doors	Ron	Short film
2018	Lady Belladonna's Tales from the Inferno	Ron	Anthology film including The 7 Doors
2018	Screwy Lucy	Mickey Stargo	Short film
