= Small Wonder (TV series) =

American television sitcom (1985–1989)

- Genre: Comedy science fiction sitcom
- Created by: Howard Leeds
- Starring: Tiffany Brissette; Dick Christie; Marla Pennington; Jerry Supiran; Emily Schulman
- Theme music composer: Rod Alexander; Howard Leeds; Diane Leslie
- Opening theme: "She's a Small Wonder"
- Ending theme: "She's a Small Wonder"
- Composers: George Greeley; Ed Lojeskie
- Country of origin: United States
- Original language: English
- No. of seasons: 4
- No. of episodes: 96 (list of episodes)

Production
- Executive producer: Howard Leeds
- Producers: Budd Grossman; Bruce Taylor
- Camera setup: Multi-camera
- Running time: 22 minutes
- Production companies: The Small Wonder Joint Venture; Metromedia Video Productions

Original release
- Network: First-run syndication
- Release: September 7, 1985 – May 20, 1989

Small Wonder is an American comedy science fiction sitcom that aired in first-run syndication from September 7, 1985, to May 20, 1989. The show chronicles the family of a robotics engineer who secretly builds a robot modeled after a human girl and tries to pass it off as their adopted daughter, Vicki.

== Premise ==
The story lines revolve around V.I.C.I. (Voice Input Child Identicant, known as "Vicki"), a robot built to resemble a young girl. Vicki was built by Ted Lawson, an engineer/inventor for United Robotronics, in an effort to assist handicapped children. Lawson takes the robot home so that it can mature within a family environment. Vicki's features include superhuman strength and speed, an AC outlet under her right arm, a data port under her left arm, and an access panel in her back. Ted passes Vicki off as the family's adopted daughter, telling people her parents were killed in an accident.

The Lawson family tries to keep the robot's existence a secret, but their disagreeable neighbors, the Brindles, keep on popping up at the most unexpected moments—especially nosy next-door neighbor Harriet, whose father happens to be Ted Lawson's co-worker. The show's humor frequently derived from Vicki's attempts to learn human behavior, her unprecedented echolalia, the robot's literal interpretation of speech and the family's efforts to disguise the robot's true nature.

To explain child actress Tiffany Brissette's aging during the show, the series' producers had Ted give Vicki an upgrade in the series' third season. He aged her face, dressed her in casual clothes, and allowed her to eat and drink. The food passed through her naturally and the drink cooled her internal system.

== Production ==
Howard Leeds, who co-created Silver Spoons, came up with the idea of a child robot who slowly adopts human traits in the early 1980s. He showed it to NBC, where he had a deal; when NBC passed, Leeds bought it back and sold it to Metromedia, which was trying to break into the first-run syndication market. Metromedia committed to 13 episodes with a budget of $300,000 each, which Leeds believed to be the lowest of any sitcom on television.

== Cast and characters ==
The cast of Small Wonder during the first season

- Dick Christie as Ted Lawson - Jamie's father, Joan's husband and Vicki's creator. A robotics engineer who originally created the Vicki robot as a domestic servant with a female child's appearance.
- Marla Pennington as Joan Anderson Lawson - Ted's wife and Jamie's mother. Joan, more than anyone else on the show, regards Vicki as a real person.
- Jerry Supiran as Jamie Lawson - The 10-year-old son of Ted and Joan.
- Emily Schulman as Harriet Brindle - The nosy neighbors' daughter who has a crush on Jamie.
- Tiffany Brissette as Victoria "Vicki" Ann Smith-Lawson - A robot modeled after a real human girl. The robot was a Voice Input Child Identicant (V.I.C.I.), but was nicknamed Vicki. She has realistic hair and skin. She possesses superhuman strength and speed and runs on atomic power. Vicki has an access panel in her back, an electrical outlet in her right armpit, and an RS-232 serial port under her left armpit. Vicki's artificial intelligence is not perfect; she is incapable of emotion, speaks in a monotone voice and interprets most commands literally. She does manage to blend into the real world to a point. Vicki attends school, and no one but her family members and a few trusted friends know her secret. Occasionally, Vicki had rare abilities that seemed to only appear in one or two episodes, such as elongating her neck to reach a door's peephole, shrinking her size to become as small as a doll or making herself ten feet tall to get noticed by everyone. Somehow, she could also channel enough electricity through her hands to jump-start a car (or with more control, serve as a defibrillator to save the life of a person suffering a heart attack). One recurring theme was that Vicki had a super-powered learning system which enabled her to improve something such as a new detergent or to greatly increase the gas mileage of cars, which Jamie often saw as a chance to get rich quick, only to find her improvements were not perfect. Vicki lives in a cabinet in Jamie's bedroom, and becomes more human-like over the course of the show.

=== Recurring ===
- Kelly Britt as Mrs. Fernwald - the bothersome social worker.
- William Bogert as Brandon Brindle - Harriet's father. Becomes Ted Lawson's boss after stealing Ted's ideas. Also a neighbor to the Lawsons.
- Edie McClurg as Bonnie Brindle - Harriet's mother and Brandon's wife. Written out after the second season after McClurg joined the cast of The Hogan Family, though Bonnie appears one more time in a third-season episode.
- Alice Ghostley as Ida Mae Brindle -Brandon's outspoken, know-it-all sister who is nearly identical to his wife Bonnie.
- Paul C. Scott as Reggie Williams - Jamie's best friend and sometimes rival.
- Lihann Jones as Jessica - Jamie's sometime girlfriend.
- Daryl Bartley as Warren Enright - Jamie's sometime school friend.
- Devon Odessa as Debbie Barnhill - Jamie's crush, and new girl
- Tiffany Brissette as Vanessa - Evil robot who looks identical to Vicki, but does not speak in a monotone (seasons 3–4).

== Reception ==
Despite proving popular among viewers, it has been regarded by some critics as one of the worst sitcoms of all time, such as Robert Bianco, TV critic for USA Today, who listed it as a contender for one of the worst TV shows of all time in 2002. According to the BBC, it "is widely considered one of the worst low-budget sitcoms of all time."

== Awards ==
| Year | Award | Category | Recipient |
|---|---|---|---|
| 1986 | Young Artist Award | Best Young Supporting Actress in a New Television Series | Emily Schulman |
| 1987 | Young Artist Award | Exceptional Performance by a Young Actress in a Long-Running Series, Comedy or Drama | Emily Schulman |

== Episodes ==
| Season | Episodes | Originally released | |
| Season | Episodes | First released | Last released |
|---|---|---|---|
| 1 | 24 | September 7, 1985 | May 17, 1986 |
| 2 | 24 | September 13, 1986 | May 23, 1987 |
| 3 | 24 | September 12, 1987 | May 21, 1988 |
| 4 | 24 | September 17, 1988 | May 20, 1989 |

== Home media ==
Shout! Factory has released the first two seasons of Small Wonder on DVD in Region 1.

| DVD name | Ep# | Region 1 |
|---|---|---|
| The Complete First Season | 24 | February 16, 2010 |
| The Complete Second Season | 24 | June 22, 2010 |

== Remake ==
An Indian Hindi-language remake Karishma Kaa Karishma aired on StarPlus from 24 January 2003 till 16 April 2004.

== See also ==
- My Living Doll. Howard Leeds, producer of Small Wonder, also produced this 1964–1965 sitcom starring Bob Cummings and Julie Newmar with the same premise as Small Wonder (except the gynoid is an adult female and the lead male character takes custody of the robot as opposed to building her).
- Not Quite Human, a series of novels in which a scientist creates an android, passing him off as his son, telling only his daughter the truth. The series was made into several TV movies for the Disney Channel.
- Dr. Slump, where a crazy Japanese inventor makes an android daughter so he can become closer to a local teacher he is in love with.
- A.I. Artificial Intelligence – also known as A.I., is a 2001 American science fiction film written, directed, and produced by Steven Spielberg, and based on Brian Aldiss's short story "Super-Toys Last All Summer Long". The film stars Haley Joel Osment, Jude Law, Sam Robards, Frances O'Connor, Brendan Gleeson, and William Hurt. Set sometime in the future, A.I. tells the story of David, a childlike android uniquely programmed with the ability to love.
- Bahu Hamari Rajni Kant — The Indian television series in which a scientist named Shaan Kant creates an android for his boss and names it RAJNI (Randomly Accessible Job Networking Interface), who becomes his wife Rajni-Kant and makes a good impression on his family. The truth about her is known only to Shaan and his friend Dev.
- Yo soy Franky and I Am Frankie - The Colombian children's telenovela and American remake has a teenage android named Frankie Gaines created by a robot scientist who wants to see how she does in high school, and has to keep it a secret from the general student body. Other androids are developed by rivals who also appear at the school.
- D.A.R.Y.L. - 1985 American science fiction film about a government-created "Data-Analyzing Robot Youth Lifeform".
- Astro Boy - a manga, TV series and animated film about a scientist who replaces his dead son with a life-like android.
