= Jerry Supiran =

American former child actor (born 1973)

- Born: Jerry Michael Supiran; March 21, 1973 (age 53); Arcadia, California, U.S.
- Occupation: Actor
- Years active: 1980–1989

Jerry Michael Supiran (born March 21, 1973) is an American former child actor. Supiran is best known for playing Jamie Lawson on the science-fiction sitcom Small Wonder, which aired from 1985 to 1989.

== Career ==
Supiran has been credited with roles in nineteen television and movie performances, including guest-starring roles in several noted series of the era, including Galactica 1980, Little House on the Prairie, Mr. Belvedere, Newhart, Highway to Heaven, Trapper John, M.D., St. Elsewhere, and Archie Bunker's Place, along with several made-for-TV movies and a feature film called Uncommon Valor.

== Personal life ==
As an adult, Supiran worked in a variety of Henderson, Nevada restaurants. In 2012 it was reported that Supiran was destitute, working as a full-time volunteer at a California homeless shelter. Supiran claimed that a former adviser and girlfriend stole from a large trust fund that held the savings from his acting career.

His mother Linda suffered a heart attack in 2012, and caring for her became a turning point in his recovery. His girlfriend of over 10 years, Michelle Malik, died of pneumonia on April 8, 2025. In February 2013, Supiran told TMZ he hoped to appear on Dancing with the Stars. As of September 2025, Supiran is married and living privately.

== Filmography ==
Year	Title	Role	Notes
1980	Galactica 1980	Super Scout	4 episodes
1981	Little House on the Prairie	Young Almanzo	Episode: "A Christmas They Never Forgot"
1982	Love, Sidney		Episode: "Sail Away"
1982	The Adventures of Little Lord Fauntleroy	Little Lord Fauntleroy	Television movie
1982	Tales of the Gold Monkey	Paul	Episode: "The Lady and the Tiger"
1982	CHiPs	student	Episode: “Head Over Heels”
1983	Archie Bunker's Place	Peter McBride	Episode: "Relief Bartender"
1983	Lottery!		Episode: "Phoenix: Blood Brothers"
1983	Policewoman Centerfold	Tommy Oaks	Television movie
1983	Newhart	Ted Ward	Episode: "Animal Attractions"
1983	Uncommon Valor	Frank at 9	
1984	Trapper John, M.D.	Matthew Riley	Episode: "Send in the Clowns"
1984	Young Hearts	Larry Fettis	Television movie
1984	Love Thy Neighbor	Joey Wilson	Television movie
1984	Fame	Keith Donlon	Episode: "The Home Front"
1984	Obsessive Love	Bobby Stevens	Television movie
1984	St. Elsewhere	Matthew Auschlander	Episode: "Fade to White"
1985–1989	Small Wonder	Jamie Lawson	94 episodes
1986	Highway to Heaven	Adam	Episode: "Close Encounters of the Heavenly Kind"
1988	Mr. Belvedere	Jordan	Episode: "Pigskin"

== Award nominations ==
Year	Award	Category	Title of work
1985	Young Artist Award	Best Young Actor in a Family Film Made for Television	Policewoman Centerfold
1986	Young Artist Award	Best Young Actor Starring in a New Television Series	Small Wonder
1987	Young Artist Award	Exceptional Performance by a Young Actor Starring in a Television Comedy or Drama Series	Small Wonder
1988	Young Artist Award	Exceptional Performance by a Young Actor in a Television Comedy Series	Small Wonder
