= Emily Schulman =

American actress

- Born: Emily Hope Schulman
- Occupation: Actress
- Years active: 1985–1995
- Children: 4

Emily Hope Schulman is an American former child actress and commercial agent, and current acting instructor. She is known for her role as next-door neighbor Harriet Brindle on the sitcom Small Wonder, which ran from 1985 to 1989.

== Career ==
By age six, Schulman had appeared in over 200 TV commercials. In 1985, she was then cast in the role of Harriet on the pilot for Small Wonder, which ran for four seasons and 96 episodes. Schulman's childhood work, though often later lampooned for its perceived kitsch, received recognition by her contemporaries: she twice won Young Artist Awards and was nominated for the peer honor three other times. Additional television credits include Finders Keepers, Hotel, Mr. Belvedere, ALF and The Wonder Years.

Schulman also starred in the 1989 films Troop Beverly Hills and Caddie Woodlawn. Her last acting appearance was on the television series Christy (with her Troop Beverly Hills co-star Kellie Martin), in which she played Ruby Mae Morrison.

== Post-acting career ==
At 17, Schulman began a career shift away from the cameras. In 2008, after 13 years as the head of Acme Talent & Literary's Commercial Division, Schulman relocated her department to its current home at Talentworks. Schulman teaches acting in Connecticut.

== Family ==
Schulman is married and has four children.

== Filmography ==
Film and television
Year	Title	Role	Notes
1985	Hotel	Debbie	Episode: "New Beginnings"
1985–1989	Small Wonder	Harriet Brindle	96 episodes
1987	Mr. Belvedere	Brenda Bilinski	Episode: "Moonlighting"
1989	Caddie Woodlawn	Caddie Woodlawn	
1989	Troop Beverly Hills	Tiffany Honigman	
1989	Knight & Daye	Chris Escobar	Episode: "Still Motile After All These Years"
1989	ALF	Girl	Episode "Live and Let Die"
1990	The Wonder Years	Susan	Episode: "Faith"
1990	ABC Afterschool Special	Anna	Episode: "The Perfect Date"
1994	Christy	Ruby Mae Morrison	TV movie
1994–1995	Christy	Ruby Mae Morrison	20 episodes
