= Young Artist Award for Best Leading Young Actress in a Feature Film =

Annual US film award

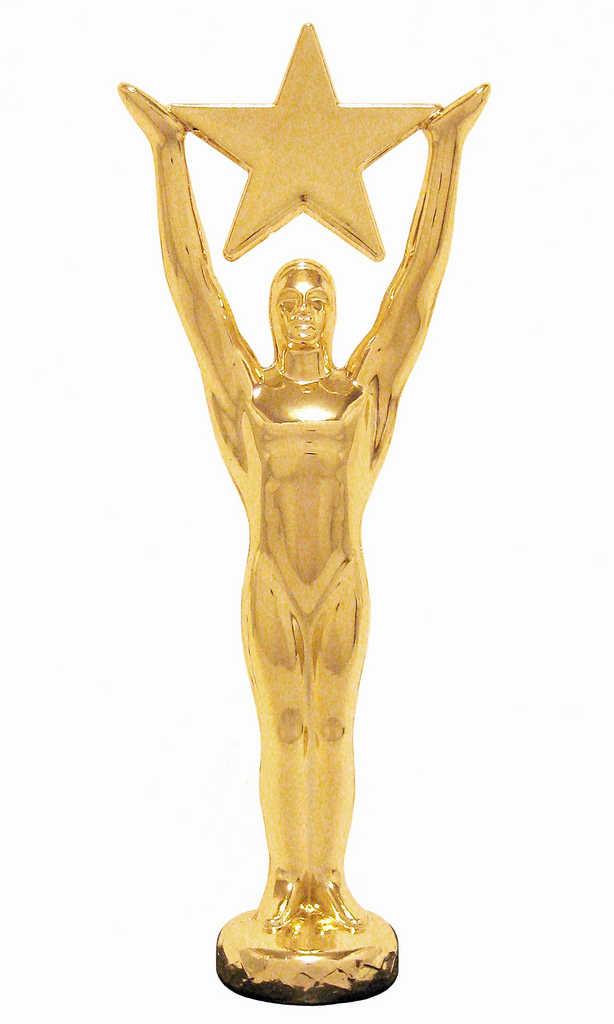
- Awarded for: Outstanding performance by a juvenile actress in a leading role in a feature film
- Country: United States of America
- Presented by: Young Artist Association
- First award: 1979 (for performances in films released during the 1978/1979 season)
- Currently held by: Tie: Kathryn Newton, Paranormal Activity 4 & Quvenzhané Wallis, Beasts of the Southern Wild (2012)
- Website: YoungArtistAwards.org

The Young Artist Award for Best Performance by a Leading Young Actress in a Feature Film is one of the Young Artist Awards presented annually by the Young Artist Association to recognize a young actress under the age of 21, who has delivered an outstanding performance in a leading role while working within the film industry. In its early years, the award was also known as the Youth in Film Award for Best Young Actress Starring in a Motion Picture, as well as by numerous other variations to its title over the years, however, the spirit of the award has remained essentially the same since its inception. Winners are selected by secret ballot of the 125 members of the Young Artist Association as well as former Youth in Film Award/Young Artist Award winners.

== History ==
Throughout the past 34 years, accounting for ties, category splits, and repeat winners, the Young Artist Association has presented a total of 44 "Best Leading Young Actress in a Feature Film" awards to 40 different actresses. Winners of the award receive the traditional Young Artist Award statuette; a gilded figure of a man displaying a star above its head, reminiscent of a miniature child-sized Oscar. The first recipient was Diane Lane, who was honored at the 1st Youth in Film Awards ceremony (1979) for her performance in A Little Romance. The most recent recipients are Kathryn Newton and Quvenzhané Wallis who tied at the 34th Young Artist Awards for their toles in Paranormal Activity 4 and Beasts of the Southern Wild respectively.

Throughout the history of the award, the "Best Young Actress in a Feature Film" category has been "split" several times. Until the 3rd Youth in Film Awards ceremony (1981), nominations for the "Best Young Actress in a Feature Film" award included all actresses, regardless of whether the performance could be perceived to be in either a leading or supporting role. At the 4th Youth in Film Awards ceremony (1982), however, the "Best Supporting Young Actress in a Feature Film" category (not listed on this page) was specifically introduced as a separate award.

In the late 1980s, the category was split for three ceremonies; the 9th Youth In Film Awards ceremony (1987), the 10th Youth in Film Awards ceremony (1988), and the 15th Youth in Film Awards ceremony (1993). During these three years, the Young Artist Association split the category into a total of four sub-categories; "Best Young Female Superstar in a Motion Picture", "Best Young Actress in a Motion Picture: Drama", "Best Young Actress in a Motion Picture: Comedy or Fantasy", and "Best Young Actress in a Motion Picture: Horror or Mystery" (all listed on this page). However, the association would once again "merge" these various sub-categories back together after the 15th Youth in Film Awards.

Beginning with the 14th Youth in Film Awards, the association once again split the category, this time creating a new category to recognize young film actresses age 10 and under in their own separate category. The "Best Young Actress Age 10 and Under in a Feature Film" category (not listed on this page) would become a permanent fixture of the Young Artist Awards and, as of 2012, is still awarded annually. Despite the creation of the "10 and Under" category, some "leading" young actresses under the age of 10 have continued to be nominated as "Best Leading Young Actress in a Feature Film".

== Superlatives ==
Although today the Young Artist Association has strict age requirements regarding which nominees are eligible for a Young Artist Award nomination, the association did not originally have such specific age restrictions. Today, candidates eligible for a Young Artist Award nomination must be between the ages of 5 and 21 at the time of principal production of the project for which they are nominated. However, the eldest winner of the "Best Young Actress in a Feature Film" award is Lea Thompson, who was 26 years old the night she won for her performance in Some Kind of Wonderful at the 9th Youth in Film Awards ceremony (1987). The youngest winner of a "Best Leading Young Actress in a Feature Film" award is Robin Weisman, who was 6 years old the night she won for her performance in Three Men and a Little Lady at the 12th Youth in Film Awards ceremony (1990).

The following list of superlatives is of winners/nominees in the "Best Leading Young Actress in a Feature Film" category. Wins/nominations in other Young Artist Award feature film categories, such as "Best Supporting Young Actress in a Feature Film", "Best Young Actress Age 10 and Under in a Feature Film", and "Best Leading Young Actress in an International Feature Film", are not included.

Superlative winners/nominees are listed alphabetically.

Superlative	Actress	Wins	Nominations
Actresses with most "Best Leading Young Actress in a Feature Film" wins	Thora Birch	2 wins	4 nominations
Actresses with most "Best Leading Young Actress in a Feature Film" wins	Anna Chlumsky	2 wins	2 nominations
Actresses with most "Best Leading Young Actress in a Feature Film" wins	Dakota Fanning	2 wins	5 nominations
Actresses with most "Best Leading Young Actress in a Feature Film" wins	Diane Lane	2 wins	3 nominations
Actress with most "Best Leading Young Actress in a Feature Film" nominations	Dakota Fanning	2 wins	5 nominations
Actress with most "Best Leading Young Actress in a Feature Film" nominations (without winning)	Christina Ricci	0 wins	4 nominations

== Winners and nominees ==
For the first twenty-three ceremonies, due to the numerous "Television" awards also presented by the Young Artist Association, the eligibility period spanned two calendar years to recognize the traditional television season. For example, the 1st Youth in Film Awards, presented in October 1979, recognized performers who appeared on television shows and in feature films that were released between September 1, 1978 and August 31, 1979. Starting with the 24th Young Artist Awards, presented in March 2003, the period of eligibility became the full previous calendar year, from January 1 to December 31, similar to the eligibility requirement used by the Academy Awards.

Following the Young Artist Association's practice, the films below are listed by year of their qualifying run, which is the year the film was released in the United States, and not by the date of the ceremony, which has traditionally taken place the following calendar year beginning with the 10th Youth in Film Awards ceremony which recognized performances during the 1987/1988 season and took place in 1989.

indicates the winner(s)

=== 1970s ===
Year	Actress	Film	Studio
1978 / 1979 (1st)
1978 / 1979 (1st)	Diane Lane	A Little Romance	Warner Bros.
1978 / 1979 (1st)	Trini Alvarado	Rich Kids	United Artists
1978 / 1979 (1st)	Mariel Hemingway	Manhattan	United Artists
1978 / 1979 (1st)	Patsy Kensit	Hanover Street	Columbia Pictures
1978 / 1979 (1st)	Brooke Shields	Just You and Me, Kid	Columbia Pictures
1978 / 1979 (1st)	Cindy Smith	Benji's Very Own Christmas Story	Mulberry Square Productions

=== 1980s ===
Year	Actress	Film	Studio
1979 / 1980 (2nd)
1979 / 1980 (2nd)	Diane Lane	Touched by Love	Sony Pictures
1979 / 1980 (2nd)	Jodie Foster	Foxes	United Artists
1979 / 1980 (2nd)	Kristy McNichol	Little Darlings	Paramount Pictures
1979 / 1980 (2nd)	Brooke Shields	The Blue Lagoon	Columbia Pictures
1980 / 1981 (3rd)
1980 / 1981 (3rd)	Kristy McNichol	Only When I Laugh	Columbia Pictures
1980 / 1981 (3rd)	Melissa Sue Anderson	Happy Birthday to Me	Columbia Pictures
1980 / 1981 (3rd)	Shelby Balik	The Incredible Shrinking Woman	Universal Studios
1980 / 1981 (3rd)	Mara Hobel	Mommie Dearest	Paramount Pictures
1980 / 1981 (3rd)	Kyle Richards	The Watcher in the Woods	Walt Disney Pictures
1980 / 1981 (3rd)	Brooke Shields	Endless Love	Columbia Pictures
1981 / 1982 (4th)
1981 / 1982 (4th)	Aileen Quinn	Annie	Columbia Pictures
1981 / 1982 (4th)	Bridgette Andersen	Savannah Smiles	Embassy Pictures
1981 / 1982 (4th)	Michelle Pfeiffer	Grease 2	Paramount Pictures
1982 / 1983 (5th)
1982 / 1983 (5th)	Roxana Zal	Table for Five	Warner Bros.
1982 / 1983 (5th)	Katherine Healy	Six Weeks	Universal Pictures
1982 / 1983 (5th)	Diane Lane	Rumble Fish	Universal Pictures
1982 / 1983 (5th)	Ally Sheedy	WarGames	Metro-Goldwyn-Mayer
1983 / 1984 (6th)
1983 / 1984 (6th)	Molly Ringwald	Sixteen Candles	Universal Pictures
1983 / 1984 (6th)	Drew Barrymore	Irreconcilable Differences	Warner Bros.
1983 / 1984 (6th)	Alison Eastwood	Tightrope	Warner Bros.
1983 / 1984 (6th)	Christina Nigra	Cloak & Dagger	Universal Pictures
1983 / 1984 (6th)	Roxana Zal	Testament	Paramount Pictures
1984 / 1985 (7th)
1984 / 1985 (7th)	Meredith Salenger	The Journey of Natty Gann	Walt Disney Pictures
1984 / 1985 (7th)	Fairuza Balk	Return to Oz	Walt Disney Pictures
1984 / 1985 (7th)	Drew Barrymore	Cat's Eye	MGM/UA
1984 / 1985 (7th)	Joyce Hyser	Just One of the Guys	Columbia Pictures
1984 / 1985 (7th)	Amanda Peterson	Explorers	Paramount Pictures
1985 / 1986 (8th)
1985 / 1986 (8th)	Laura Jacoby	Rad	TriStar Pictures
1985 / 1986 (8th)	Lucy Deakins	The Boy Who Could Fly	20th Century Fox
1985 / 1986 (8th)	Kerri Green	Lucas	20th Century Fox
1985 / 1986 (8th)	Melora Hardin	Papa Was a Preacher	LaRose Productions
1985 / 1986 (8th)	Elisabeth Harnois	One Magic Christmas	Walt Disney Pictures
1985 / 1986 (8th)	Robyn Lively	Wildcats	Warner Bros.
1985 / 1986 (8th)	Alyssa Milano	Commando	20th Century Fox
1985 / 1986 (8th)	Heather O'Rourke	Poltergeist II: The Other Side	Metro-Goldwyn-Mayer
1986 / 1987 (9th)
1986 / 1987 (9th)	Superstar: Lisa Bonet	Angel Heart	TriStar Pictures
1986 / 1987 (9th)	Martha Plimpton	The Mosquito Coast	Warner Bros.
1986 / 1987 (9th)	Kristy Swanson	Deadly Friend	Warner Bros.
1986 / 1987 (9th)	Drama: Lea Thompson	Some Kind of Wonderful	Paramount Pictures
1986 / 1987 (9th)	J. L. Reate	The Golden Child	Paramount Pictures
1986 / 1987 (9th)	Ione Skye	River's Edge	Hemdale/Island Pictures
1986 / 1987 (9th)	Comedy: Maia Brewton	Adventures in Babysitting	Buena Vista/Touchstone Pictures
1986 / 1987 (9th)	Tina Caspary	Can't Buy Me Love	Touchstone Pictures
1986 / 1987 (9th)	Margaret Langrick	Harry and the Hendersons	Universal Studios
1986 / 1987 (9th)	Amanda Peterson	Can't Buy Me Love	Touchstone Pictures
1986 / 1987 (9th)	Horror: Christa Denton	The Gate	Alliance Entertainment
1986 / 1987 (9th)	Carrie Lorraine	Dolls	Empire Pictures
1986 / 1987 (9th)	Jill Schoelen	The Stepfather	New Century Vista Film Company
1987 / 1988 (10th)
1987 / 1988 (10th)	Drama: Hayley Taylor-Block	Touch of a Stranger	Raven Star
1987 / 1988 (10th)	Annabeth Gish	Mystic Pizza	The Samuel Goldwyn Company
1987 / 1988 (10th)	Laura Jane Goodwin	Crystalstone	Moviestore Entertainment
1987 / 1988 (10th)	Marcie Leeds	Beaches	Touchstone Pictures
1987 / 1988 (10th)	Mindy McEnnan	World Gone Wild	Apollo Pictures
1987 / 1988 (10th)	Martha Plimpton	Running on Empty	Warner Bros.
1987 / 1988 (10th)	Julia Roberts	Mystic Pizza	The Samuel Goldwyn Company
1987 / 1988 (10th)	Meredith Salenger	A Night in the Life of Jimmy Reardon	20th Century Fox
1987 / 1988 (10th)	Comedy/Fantasy: Mayim Bialik	Beaches	Touchstone Pictures
1987 / 1988 (10th)	Tina Caspary	Mac and Me	Orion Pictures
1987 / 1988 (10th)	Angela Goethals	Heartbreak Hotel	Touchstone Pictures
1987 / 1988 (10th)	Heather Graham	License to Drive	20th Century Fox
1987 / 1988 (10th)	Alyson Hannigan	My Stepmother Is an Alien	Columbia Pictures
1987 / 1988 (10th)	Lauren Stanley	Mac and Me	Orion Pictures
1987 / 1988 (10th)	Horror/Mystery: Kristy Swanson	Flowers in the Attic	New World Pictures
1987 / 1988 (10th)	Jennifer Banko	Friday the 13th Part VII: The New Blood	Paramount Pictures
1987 / 1988 (10th)	Paula Irvine	Phantasm II	Universal Studios
1987 / 1988 (10th)	Marcie Leeds	Near Dark	Anchor Bay Entertainment
1987 / 1988 (10th)	Ebonie Smith	Lethal Weapon	Warner Bros.
1987 / 1988 (10th)	Shawnee Smith	The Blob	TriStar Pictures
1987 / 1988 (10th)	Brooke Theiss	A Nightmare on Elm Street 4: The Dream Master	New Line Cinema
1988 / 1989 (11th)
1988 / 1989 (11th)	Winona Ryder	Great Balls of Fire!	Orion Pictures
1988 / 1989 (11th)	Blaze Berdahl	Pet Sematary	Paramount Pictures
1988 / 1989 (11th)	Rebecca Harrell	Prancer	Orion Pictures
1988 / 1989 (11th)	Jenny Lewis	The Wizard	Universal Studios
1988 / 1989 (11th)	Robyn Lively	Teen Witch	Metro-Goldwyn-Mayer
1988 / 1989 (11th)	Sarah Polley	The Adventures of Baron Munchausen	Columbia Pictures

=== 1990s ===
Year	Actress	Film	Studio
1989 / 1990 (12th)
1989 / 1990 (12th)	Robin Weisman	Three Men and a Little Lady	Touchstone Pictures
1989 / 1990 (12th)	Kimberly Cullum	The Rapture	New Line Cinema
1989 / 1990 (12th)	Brooke Fontaine	Ghost Dad	Universal Pictures
1989 / 1990 (12th)	Staci Keanan	Lisa	United Artists
1989 / 1990 (12th)	Lexi Faith Randall	The Long Walk Home	Miramax Films
1990 / 1991 (13th)
1990 / 1991 (13th)	Thora Birch	Paradise	Buena Vista Pictures
1990 / 1991 (13th)	Mikki Allen	Regarding Henry	Paramount Pictures
1990 / 1991 (13th)	Angela Goethals	V.I. Warshawki	Buena Vista Pictures
1990 / 1991 (13th)	Heather Graham	Shout	Universal Studios
1990 / 1991 (13th)	Milla Jovovich	Return to the Blue Lagoon	Columbia Pictures
1990 / 1991 (13th)	Reese Witherspoon	Man in the Moon	Metro-Goldwyn-Mayer
1991 / 1992 (14th)
1991 / 1992 (14th)	Alisan Porter	Curly Sue	Warner Bros.
1991 / 1992 (14th)	Thora Birch	All I Want for Christmas	Paramount Pictures
1991 / 1992 (14th)	Samantha Mathis	This Is My Life	20th Century Fox
1991 / 1992 (14th)	Christina Ricci	The Addams Family	Paramount Pictures
1991 / 1992 (14th)	Meadow Sisto	Captain Ron	Touchstone Pictures
1991 / 1992 (14th)	Nicholle Tom	Beethoven	Universal Studios
1992 / 1993 (15th)
1992 / 1993 (15th)	Drama: Ariana Richards	Jurassic Park	Universal Studios
1992 / 1993 (15th)	Clarissa Lassig	A Home of Our Own	Gramercy Pictures
1992 / 1993 (15th)	Kate Maberly	The Secret Garden	Warner Bros.
1992 / 1993 (15th)	Remy Ryan	RoboCop 3	Orion Pictures
1992 / 1993 (15th)	Alicia Silverstone	The Crush	Warner Bros.
1992 / 1993 (15th)	Comedy: Thora Birch (tie)	Hocus Pocus	Walt Disney Pictures
1992 / 1993 (15th)	Comedy: Christina Vidal (tie)	Life with Mikey	Touchstone Pictures
1992 / 1993 (15th)	Senta Moses	Home Alone 2: Lost in New York	20th Century Fox
1992 / 1993 (15th)	Amy Sakasitz	Dennis the Menace	Warner Bros.
1992 / 1993 (15th)	Vinessa Shaw	Hocus Pocus	Walt Disney Pictures
1992 / 1993 (15th)	Madeline Zima	Mr. Nanny	New Line Cinema
1993 / 1994 (16th)
1993 / 1994 (16th)	Anna Chlumsky	My Girl 2	Columbia Pictures
1993 / 1994 (16th)	Alana Austin	A Simple Twist of Fate	Touchstone Pictures
1993 / 1994 (16th)	Zelda Harris	Crooklyn	Universal Studios
1993 / 1994 (16th)	Katherine Heigl	My Father the Hero	Touchstone Pictures
1994 / 1995 (17th)
1994 / 1995 (17th)	Anna Chlumsky	Gold Diggers: The Secret of Bear Mountain	Universal Studios
1994 / 1995 (17th)	Vanessa Lee Chester	A Little Princess	Warner Bros.
1994 / 1995 (17th)	Claire Danes	Home for the Holidays	Paramount Pictures
1994 / 1995 (17th)	Kirsten Dunst	Jumanji	TriStar Pictures
1994 / 1995 (17th)	Nicole Lund	Gold Diggers: The Secret of Bear Mountain	Universal Studios
1994 / 1995 (17th)	Liesel Matthews	A Little Princess	Warner Bros.
1994 / 1995 (17th)	Christina Ricci	Casper	Universal Studios
1994 / 1995 (17th)	Alicia Silverstone	Clueless	Paramount Pictures
1995 / 1996 (18th)
1995 / 1996 (18th)	Michelle Trachtenberg	Harriet the Spy	Paramount Pictures
1995 / 1996 (18th)	Thora Birch	Alaska	Columbia Pictures
1995 / 1996 (18th)	Heather Matarazzo	Welcome to the Dollhouse	Sony Pictures Classics
1995 / 1996 (18th)	Anna Paquin	Fly Away Home	Columbia Pictures
1995 / 1996 (18th)	Mara Wilson	Matilda	TriStar Pictures
1996 / 1997 (19th)
1996 / 1997 (19th)	Mara Wilson	A Simple Wish	Universal Pictures
1996 / 1997 (19th)	Jennifer Love Hewitt	I Know What You Did Last Summer	Columbia Pictures
1996 / 1997 (19th)	Florence Hoath	Fairy Tale: A True Story	Paramount Pictures
1996 / 1997 (19th)	Christina Ricci	That Darn Cat	Walt Disney Pictures
1996 / 1997 (19th)	Jurnee Smollett	Eve's Bayou	Trimark Pictures
1997 / 1998 (20th)
1997 / 1998 (20th)	Lindsay Lohan (tie)	The Parent Trap	Walt Disney Pictures
1997 / 1998 (20th)	Jena Malone (tie)	Stepmom	Columbia Pictures
1997 / 1998 (20th)	Kirsten Dunst	Small Soldiers	DreamWorks
1997 / 1998 (20th)	Jennifer Love Hewitt	Can't Hardly Wait	Columbia Pictures
1997 / 1998 (20th)	Scarlett Johansson	The Horse Whisperer	Touchstone Pictures
1997 / 1998 (20th)	Emily Lipoma	Frog and Wombat	Pigtail Productions
1997 / 1998 (20th)	Leelee Sobieski	A Soldier's Daughter Never Cries	October Films
1997 / 1998 (20th)	Katie Stuart	Frog and Wombat	Pigtail Productions
1998 / 1999 (21st)
1998 / 1999 (21st)	Kimberly J. Brown	Tumbleweeds	Fine Line Features
1998 / 1999 (21st)	Brittany Murphy	Girl, Interrupted	Columbia Pictures
1998 / 1999 (21st)	Natalie Portman	Anywhere but Here	20th Century Fox
1998 / 1999 (21st)	Christina Ricci	Sleepy Hollow	Paramount Pictures
1998 / 1999 (21st)	Michelle Williams	Dick	TriStar Pictures

=== 2000s ===
Year	Actress	Film	Studio
1999 / 2000 (22nd)
1999 / 2000 (22nd)	Elizabeth Huett	Social Misfits	Our Way Productions
1999 / 2000 (22nd)	Kirsten Dunst	Bring It On	Universal Studios
1999 / 2000 (22nd)	Natalie Portman	Where the Heart Is	20th Century Fox
1999 / 2000 (22nd)	Jamie Renée Smith	MVP: Most Valuable Primate	Keystone Family Pictures
1999 / 2000 (22nd)	Mara Wilson	Thomas and the Magic Railroad	Destination Films
2000 / 2001 (23rd)
2000 / 2001 (23rd)	Scarlett Johansson (tie)	An American Rhapsody	Paramount Classics
2000 / 2001 (23rd)	Emma Watson (tie)	Harry Potter and the Sorcerer's Stone	Warner Bros.
2000 / 2001 (23rd)	Hayden Panettiere	Joe Somebody	20th Century Fox
2002 (24th)
2002 (24th)	Alexa Vega	Spy Kids 2: The Island of Lost Dreams	Buena Vista Pictures
2002 (24th)	Amanda Bynes	Big Fat Liar	Universal Studios
2002 (24th)	America Ferrera	Real Women Have Curves	Newmarket Films/HBO Films
2002 (24th)	Kristen Stewart	Panic Room	Columbia Pictures
2002 (24th)	Evan Rachel Wood	Little Secrets	Columbia TriStar/Samuel Goldwyn
2003 (25th)
2003 (25th)	Jenna Boyd	The Missing	Revolution Studios
2003 (25th)	Dakota Fanning	The Cat in the Hat	Universal Studios
2003 (25th)	Rachel Hurd-Wood	Peter Pan	Universal Studios
2003 (25th)	Lindsay Lohan	Freaky Friday	Walt Disney Pictures
2003 (25th)	Evan Rachel Wood	The Missing	Universal Pictures
2004 (26th)
2004 (26th)	Emmy Rossum	The Phantom of the Opera	Warner Bros.
2004 (26th)	Emily Browning	Lemony Snicket's A Series of Unfortunate Events	Paramount Pictures/DreamWorks
2004 (26th)	Dakota Fanning	Man on Fire	20th Century Fox
2004 (26th)	Carly Schroeder	Mean Creek	Paramount Classics
2004 (26th)	Alexa Vega	Sleepover	Metro-Goldwyn-Mayer
2005 (27th)
2005 (27th)	Dakota Fanning	Dreamer	DreamWorks
2005 (27th)	Taylor Dooley	The Adventures of Sharkboy and Lavagirl in 3-D	Columbia Pictures
2005 (27th)	Jordan-Claire Green	Come Away Home	Haven Films
2005 (27th)	Q'orianka Kilcher	The New World	New Line Cinema
2005 (27th)	AnnaSophia Robb	Because of Winn-Dixie	20th Century Fox
2006 (28th)
2006 (28th)	Keke Palmer	Akeelah and the Bee	Lionsgate
2006 (28th)	Keisha Castle-Hughes	The Nativity Story	New Line Cinema
2006 (28th)	Dakota Fanning	Charlotte's Web	Paramount Pictures
2006 (28th)	Brie Larson	Hoot	New Line Cinema
2006 (28th)	Sara Paxton	Aquamarine	Fox 2000 Pictures
2006 (28th)	Emily Rios	Quinceañera	Sony Pictures
2007 (29th)
2007 (29th)	AnnaSophia Robb	Bridge to Terabithia	Buena Vista Pictures
2007 (29th)	Gracie Bednarczyk	Grace Is Gone	The Weinstein Company
2007 (29th)	Abigail Breslin	No Reservations	Warner Bros.
2007 (29th)	Isamar Gonzales	Chop Shop	Koch-Lorber Films
2007 (29th)	Kay Panabaker	Moondance Alexander	20th Century Fox
2007 (29th)	Dakota Blue Richards	The Golden Compass	New Line Cinema
2007 (29th)	Emma Roberts	Nancy Drew	Warner Bros.
2007 (29th)	Saoirse Ronan	Atonement	Focus Features
2008 (30th)
2008 (30th)	Dakota Fanning	The Secret Life of Bees	Fox Searchlight
2008 (30th)	Abigail Breslin	Kit Kittredge: An American Girl	New Line Cinema
2008 (30th)	Madeline Carroll	Swing Vote	Walt Disney Pictures
2008 (30th)	Georgie Henley	The Chronicles of Narnia: Prince Caspian	Walt Disney Pictures
2008 (30th)	Keke Palmer	The Longshots	Metro-Goldwyn-Mayer
2009 (31st)
2009 (31st)	Abigail Breslin	My Sister's Keeper	New Line Cinema
2009 (31st)	Emma Roberts	Hotel for Dogs	DreamWorks/Paramount Pictures
2009 (31st)	Saoirse Ronan	The Lovely Bones	DreamWorks
2009 (31st)	Yara Shahidi	Imagine That	Paramount Pictures
2009 (31st)	Jolie Vanier	Shorts	Warner Bros.

=== 2010s ===
Year	Actress	Film	Studio
2010 (32nd)
2010 (32nd)	Hailee Steinfeld	True Grit	Paramount Pictures
2010 (32nd)	Delanie Armstrong	Lavanderia]	Stauros Entertainment
2010 (32nd)	Elle Fanning	The Nutcracker in 3D	Freestyle Releasing
2010 (32nd)	Jennifer Lawrence	Winter's Bone	Roadside Attractions
2010 (32nd)	Chloë Grace Moretz	Kick-Ass	Universal Pictures
2011 (33rd)
2011 (33rd)	Chloë Grace Moretz	Hugo	Paramount Pictures
2011 (33rd)	Jordana Beatty	Judy Moody and the Not Bummer Summer	Relativity Media
2011 (33rd)	Elle Fanning	Super 8	Paramount Pictures
2011 (33rd)	Saoirse Ronan	Hanna	Focus Features
2011 (33rd)	Ariel Winter	The Chaperone	Samuel Goldwyn Films
2012 (34th)
2012 (34th)	Kathryn Newton (tie)	Paranormal Activity 4	Paramount Pictures
2012 (34th)	Quvenzhané Wallis (tie)	Beasts of the Southern Wild	Fox Searchlight Pictures
2012 (34th)	Tara Lynne Barr	God Bless America	Magnolia Pictures
2012 (34th)	Kara Hayward	Moonrise Kingdom	Focus Features
2013 (35th)
2013 (35th)	Sophie Nélisse (tie)	The Book Thief	20th Century Fox
2013 (35th)	Loreto Peralta (tie)	Instructions Not Included	Pantelion Films
2013 (35th)	Annalise Basso	Standing Up	Aldamisa Entertainment
2013 (35th)	Megan Charpentier	Mama	Universal Pictures
2013 (35th)	Abigail Hargrove	World War Z	Paramount Pictures

== See also ==
- Academy Juvenile Award
- Broadcast Film Critics Association Award for Best Young Performer
- Saturn Award for Best Performance by a Younger Actor
- Young Artist Award for Best Leading Young Actor in a Feature Film
