= 3rd Youth in Film Awards =

1981 US media awards ceremony

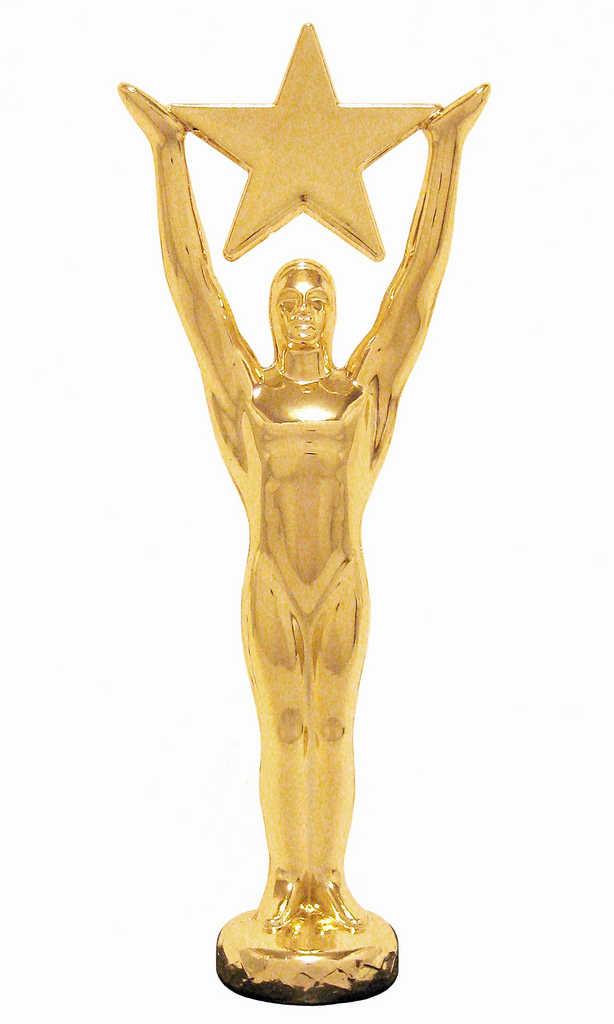
- Awarded for: Achievement in the 1980—1981 season
- Date: December 1981
- Site: Hollywood, California
- Hosted by: Dana Hill and Henry Thomas

The 3rd Youth in Film Awards ceremony (now known as the Young Artist Awards), presented by the Youth in Film Association, honored outstanding youth performers in the fields of film, television and music for the 1980-1981 season, and took place in December 1981 in Hollywood, California.

Established in 1978 by long-standing Hollywood Foreign Press Association member, Maureen Dragone, the Youth in Film Association was the first organization to establish an awards ceremony specifically set to recognize and award the contributions of performers under the age of 18 in the fields of film, television, theater and music.

Although the Youth in Film Awards were conceived as a way to primarily recognize youth performers under the age of 21, the eldest winner in a competitive category at the 3rd annual ceremony was Lionel Richie who was 32 years old on the night he won as "Best Young Musical Recording Artist - Male" for his song "Endless Love" from the soundtrack for the motion picture Endless Love.

The 3rd annual ceremony also marked the first and only time in the history of the Youth in Film Awards that a fictional character would be nominated in a competitive category, with "Little Miss Piggy" winning as "Best Young Musical Recording Artist - Female" for her song "The First Time It Happens" from the soundtrack for the motion picture The Great Muppet Caper.

== Categories ==
★ Bold indicates the winner in each category.

== Best Young Performer in a Feature Film ==
=== Best Young Motion Picture Actor ===
★ Ricky Schroder - The Earthling - Filmways as Shawn Daley

- Martin Hewitt - Endless Love - Columbia as David Axelrod
- Otto Rechenberg - Amy - Disney as Henry Watkins
- Paul Schoeman - Child's Play - AFI as Conrad
- Gabriel Swann - Why Would I Lie? - M.G.M. as Jorge
- Henry Thomas - Raggedy Man - Universal as Harry

=== Best Young Motion Picture Actress ===
★ Kristy McNichol - Only When I Laugh - Columbia as Polly Hines

- Melissa Sue Anderson - Happy Birthday to Me - Columbia as Virginia "Ginny" Wainwright
- Shelby Balik - The Incredible Shrinking Woman - Universal as Beth Kramer
- Mara Hobel - Mommie Dearest - Paramount as Young Christina Crawford
- Kyle Richards - The Watcher in the Woods - Disney as Ellie Curtis
- Brooke Shields - Endless Love - Columbia as Jade Butterfield

== Best Young Performer in a Television Special ==
=== Best Young Actor in a Television Special ===
★ Scott Baio - Stoned - ABC as Jack Melon

- Adam Gunn - Fallen Angel - CBS as David
- Lance Kerwin - Circus Picture
- Ralph Macchio - Eight is Enough - ABC as Jeremy Andretti
- Doug McKeon - The Comeback Kid - ABC as Michael
- Shane Sinutko - CBS Afternoon Playhouse: I Think I'm Having a Baby - CBS as Steven

=== Best Young Actress in a Television Special ===
★ Dana Hill - Fallen Angel - CBS as Jennifer Phillips

- Tonya Crowe - Dark Night of the Scarecrow - CBS as Marylee Williams
- Melissa Gilbert - Splendor in the Grass - NBC as Wilma Dean 'Deanie' Loomis
- Dana Plato - A Step in Time - KCET as Self
- Melissa Michaelsen - Broken Promise - CBS as Patty Clawson
- Lisa Whelchel - Twirl - NBC as Jill Moore

== Best Young Performer in a Television Series ==
=== Best Young Actor in a Television Series ===
★ Timothy Gibbs - Father Murphy - NBC as Will Adams

- Scott Baio - Happy Days - ABC as Chachi Arcola
- Philip McKeon - Alice - ABC as Tommy Hyatt
- Glenn Scarpelli - One Day at a Time - CBS as Alex Handris

=== Best Young Actress in a Television Series ===
★ Danielle Brisebois - Archie Bunker's Place - CBS as Stephanie Mills

- Olivia Barash - Little House on the Prairie ("Sylvia" segment) - NBC as Sylvia Webb
- Missy Francis - Little House on the Prairie - NBC as Cassandra Cooper Ingalls
- Dana Hill - The Two of Us - CBS as Gabby Gallagher
- Katy Kurtzman - Dynasty - ABC as Lindsay Blaisdel
- Jill Whelan - The Love Boat - ABC as Vicki Stubing

=== Best Young Actor in a Daytime Series ===
★ Michael Damian - The Young and the Restless - CBS as Danny Romalotti

- Dick Billingsley - Days of Our Lives - NBC as Scotty Banning
- Marc Bentley - The Young and the Restless - CBS as Chucky Roulland
- Damien Miller - Texas - ABC as Steve Marshall
- Philip Tanzini - General Hospital - ABC as Jeremy Hewitt

=== Best Young Actress in a Daytime Series ===
★ Becky Perle - The Kid Super Power Hour with Shazam! - NBC as Glorious Gal

- Genie Francis - General Hospital - ABC as Laura Spencer
- Dana Klaboe - Another World - NBC as Amanda Cory

== Best Young Comedy Performer ==
=== Best Young Comedian: Motion Picture or Television ===
★ Scott Baio - Happy Days - ABC as Chachi Arcola

- Gary Coleman - Diff'rent Strokes - NBC as Arnold Jackson
- Peter Billingsley - Paternity - Paramount as Tad
- Glenn Scarpelli - One Day at a Time - CBS as Alex Handris

=== Best Young Comedienne: Motion Picture or Television ===
★ Kim Fields - The Facts of Life - NBC as Dorothy "Tootie" Ramsey

- Mindy Cohn - The Facts of Life - NBC as Natalie Green
- Rori King - I'm a Big Girl Now - ABC as Becky Cassidy
- Nancy McKeon - The Facts of Life - NBC as Jo Polniaczek
- Natasha Ryan - Ladies Man - CBS as Amy Thackeray
- Lisa Whelchel - The Facts of Life - NBC as Blair Warner

== Best Young Musical Recording Artist ==
=== Best Young Musical Recording Artist - Male ===
★ Lionel Richie - Endless Love - Mercury

- Jim Photoglo - Fool in Love with You - 20th Century Fox
- Russell Smith - Honky Tonk Freeway - Capitol

=== Best Young Musical Recording Artist - Female ===
★ Little Miss Piggy - The First Time It Happens - Atlantic

- Stephanie Mills - Two Hearts - 20th Century Fox
- Pia Zadora - Those Eyes - Curb Warner Records Corp.

== Best Family Entertainment ==
=== Best Motion Picture - Family Enjoyment ===
★ Raiders of the Lost Ark - Paramount

- Amy - Disney
- Mommie Dearest - Paramount
- Only When I Laugh - Columbia
- The Earthling - Filmways

=== Best Motion Picture: Fantasy or Comedy - Family Enjoyment ===
★ Clash of the Titans - M.G.M.

- The Fox and the Hound - Disney
- The Great Muppet Caper - Universal
- The Incredible Shrinking Woman - Universal
- Why Would I Lie? - M.G.M.

=== Best Television Special - Family Enjoyment ===
★ The Wave - T.A.T. Communications / ABC

- Broken Promises - CBS
- Fallen Angel - CBS
- Leave 'Em Laughing - CBS
- A Step in Time - KCET
- Twirl - NBC

=== Best Television Series - Family Enjoyment ===
★ Father Murphy - NBC

- Diff'rent Strokes - NBC
- The Facts of Life - NBC
- Little House on the Prairie - NBC
- Happy Days - ABC

=== Best Children's Television Series ===
★ ABC Weekend Special: The Notorious Jumping Frog of Calaveras County - ABC

- Captain Kangaroo - CBS
- The Kid Super Power Hour with Shazam! - NBC
- Superman and His Amazing Friends - NBC (possibly Super Friends - ABC)
- 30 Minutes - CBS

== Special Award ==
=== Former Great Child Star Award ===
★ Patsy Garrett
