= Young Artist Former Child Star Lifetime Achievement Award =

Honorary Young Artist Award

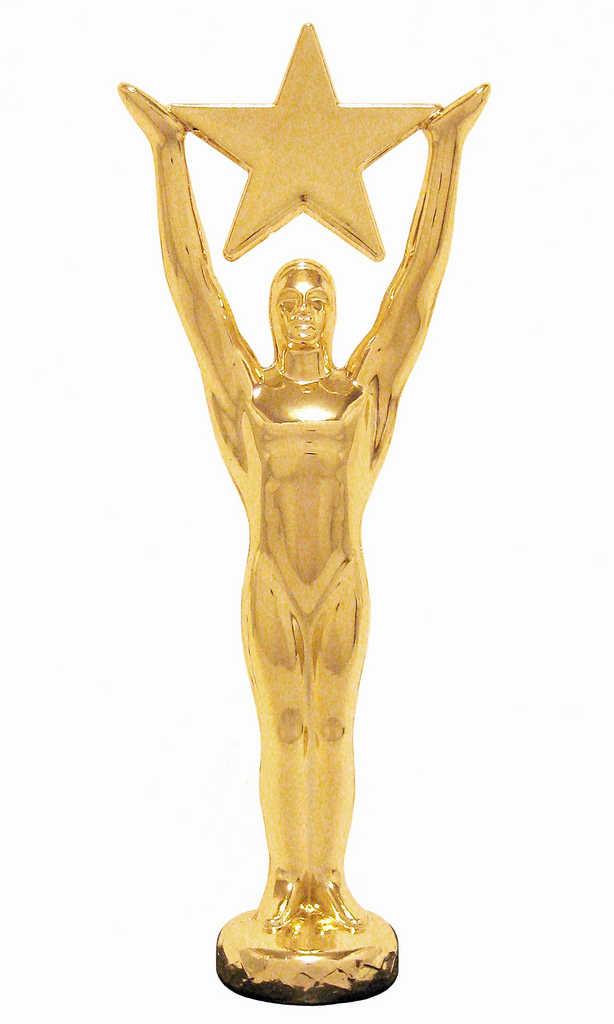
- Awarded for: Outstanding achievements of former child actors/singers in film, television and radio
- Country: United States of America
- Presented by: Young Artist Association
- First award: 1979
- Website: YoungArtistAwards.org

The Young Artist Former Child Star Lifetime Achievement Award is an honorary Young Artist Award bestowed by the Young Artist Association to recognize former child actors and/or child singers for lifetime achievement within the motion picture, television and radio industries. In recent years, the award has also been known as the Mickey Rooney Award, in honor of former child star Mickey Rooney, however, the spirit of the award has remained essentially the same since its inception.

== History ==
First presented in 1979, the "Former Child Star Award" was one of the Young Artist Association's original "Special Awards". Throughout the past 34 years, the association has conferred its special "Lifetime Achievement Award" upon 29 former child actors and child singers for their work within the entertainment industry. Recipients of the honor receive the traditional Young Artist Award statuette; a gilded figure of a man displaying a star above its head, reminiscent of a miniature child-sized Oscar.

The first recipient was Jane Withers, who was honored at the 1st Youth in Film Awards ceremony for her work as a child actress on radio and in feature films during the 1930s. The 2013 recipient is Melissa Joan Hart, who will be honored at the 34th Young Artist Awards ceremony for her roles as Clarissa Darling on the 1990s Nickelodeon sitcom Clarissa Explains It All and as Sabrina Spellman on the ABC sitcom Sabrina, the Teenage Witch. After former child star Mickey Rooney received the accolade at the 12th Youth in Film Awards ceremony, the award has also been known as the "Mickey Rooney Award" in his honor.

== Honorees ==
As one of the Young Artist Association's "Honorary" awards, the traditional age restrictions used for the association's "competitive" categories do not apply. Candidates eligible for nomination in one of the Young Artist Award's competitive categories must be between the ages of 5 and 21, and winners are selected by secret ballot of the 125 members of the Young Artist Association as well as former Youth in Film Award/Young Artist Award winners. As the title of the award implies, a "former" child star can be presumed to be over the age of 21, however, all honorees are recognized specifically for their achievements within the entertainment industry as juveniles.

Young Artist Former Child Star Lifetime Achievement Award
Ceremony	Honoree	Notable Work	Ref.
1st Youth in Film Awards	Jane Withers	Bright Eyes (1934)	
2nd Youth in Film Awards	—	—	
3rd Youth in Film Awards	Patsy Garrett	Fred Waring's "Pleasure Time" (1939–1945)	
4th Youth in Film Awards	—	—	
5th Youth in Film Awards	Ann Jillian	Gypsy (1962)	
6th Youth in Film Awards	Jerry Mathers	Leave It to Beaver (1957–1963)	
7th Youth in Film Awards	—	—	
8th Youth in Film Awards	—	—	
9th Youth in Film Awards	Tony Dow	Leave It to Beaver (1957–1963)	
9th Youth in Film Awards	Ken Osmond	Leave It to Beaver (1957–1963)	
10th Youth in Film Awards	Barry Williams	The Brady Bunch (1969–1974)	
11th Youth in Film Awards	Margaret O'Brien	Journey for Margaret (1942)	
11th Youth in Film Awards	Jon Provost	Lassie (1957–1964)	
12th Youth in Film Awards	Mickey Rooney	Mickey McGuire (film series) (1927–1934)	
13th Youth in Film Awards	Brandon Cruz	The Courtship of Eddie's Father (1969–1972)	
13th Youth in Film Awards	Gloria Jean	The Under-Pup (1939)	
14th Youth in Film Awards	—	—	
15th Youth in Film Awards	Shelley Fabares	The Donna Reed Show (1958–1965)	
15th Youth in Film Awards	Jimmy Hawkins	It's a Wonderful Life (1946)	
16th Youth in Film Awards	Robert Blake	The Little Rascals (film series) (1939–1944)	
17th Youth in Film Awards	—	—	
18th Youth in Film Awards	Paul Petersen	The Donna Reed Show (1958–1966)	
19th Youth in Film Awards	Gigi Perreau	My Foolish Heart (1949)	
20th Youth in Film Awards	Drew Barrymore	E.T. the Extra-Terrestrial (1982)	
20th Youth in Film Awards	Johnny Whitaker	Family Affair (1966–1971)	
21st Young Artist Awards	Lucille Bliss	Cinderella (1950)	
22nd Young Artist Awards	Charlene Tilton	Dallas (1978–1990)	
22nd Young Artist Awards	Jay Underwood	The Boy Who Could Fly (1986)	
23rd Young Artist Awards	Alison Arngrim	Little House on the Prairie (1974–1981)	
24th Young Artist Awards	Danny Bonaduce	The Partridge Family (1970–1974)	
25th Young Artist Awards	—	—	
26th Young Artist Awards	—	—	
27th Young Artist Awards	Victoria Paige Meyerink	The Danny Kaye Show (1964–1967)	
28th Young Artist Awards	—	—	
29th Young Artist Awards	Jim Turner	Kung Fu (1973)	
30th Young Artist Awards	—	—	
31st Young Artist Awards	Kathy Garver	Family Affair (1966–1971)	
32nd Young Artist Awards	Mario Lopez	Saved by the Bell (1989–1994)	
33rd Young Artist Awards	—	—	
34th Young Artist Awards	Melissa Joan Hart	Clarissa Explains It All (1991–1994); Sabrina, the Teenage Witch (1996–2003)	

== See also ==
- Hollywood Walk of Fame
- Young Artist Award
