= Young Artist Award for Best Leading Young Actor in a Feature Film =

Annual US film award

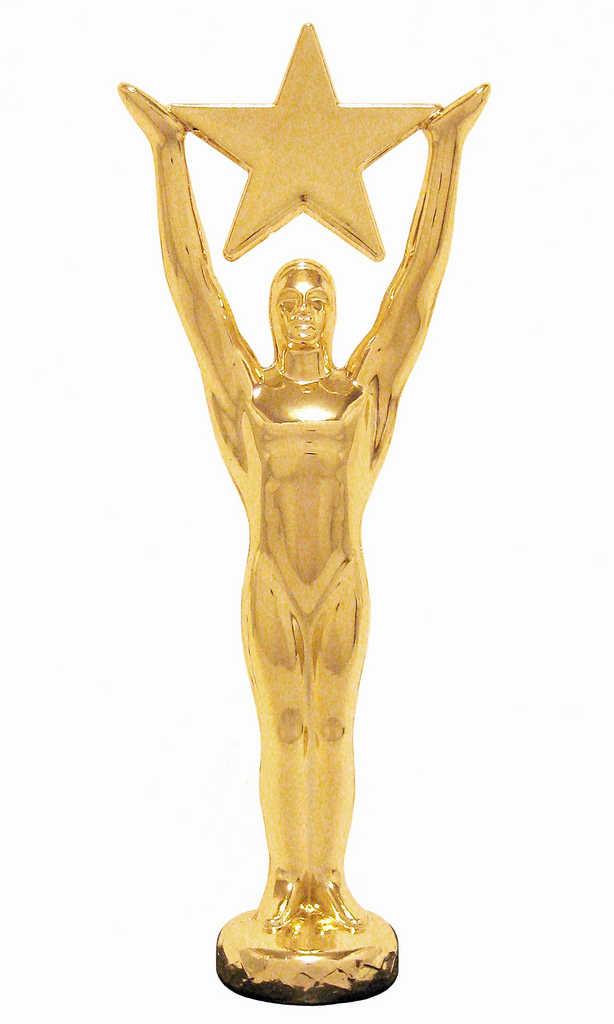
- Awarded for: Outstanding performance by a juvenile actor in a leading role in a feature film
- Country: United States
- Presented by: Young Artist Association
- First award: 1979 (for performances in films released during the 1978/1979 season)
- Currently held by: Tom Holland, The Impossible (2012)
- Website: http://www.youngartistawards.org

The Young Artist Award for Best Performance by a Leading Young Actor in a Feature Film is one of the Young Artist Awards presented annually by the Young Artist Association to recognize a young actor under the age of 21, who has delivered an outstanding performance in a leading role while working within the film industry. In its early years, the award was also known as the Youth in Film Award for Best Young Actor Starring in a Motion Picture, as well as by numerous other variations to its title over the years, however, the spirit of the award has remained essentially the same since its inception. Winners are selected by secret ballot of the 125 members of the Young Artist Association as well as former Youth in Film Award/Young Artist Award winners.

== History ==
Throughout the past 34 years, accounting for ties, category splits, and repeat winners, the Young Artist Association has presented a total of 43 "Best Leading Young Actor in a Feature Film" awards to 40 different actors. Winners of the award receive the traditional Young Artist Award statuette; a gilded figure of a man displaying a star above its head, reminiscent of a miniature child-sized Oscar. The first recipient was Dennis Christopher, who was honored at the 1st Youth in Film Awards ceremony (1979) for his performance in Breaking Away. The most recent recipient was Tom Holland, who was honored at the 34th Young Artist Awards ceremony (2012) for his performance in The Impossible.

Throughout the history of the award, the "Best Young Actor in a Feature Film" category has been "split" several times. Until the 3rd Youth in Film Awards ceremony (1981), nominations for the "Best Young Actor in a Feature Film" award included all actors, regardless of whether the performance could be perceived to be in either a leading or supporting role. At the 4th Youth in Film Awards ceremony (1982), however, the "Best Supporting Young Actor in a Feature Film" category (not listed on this page) was specifically introduced as a separate award.

In the late 1980s, the category was split for three ceremonies; the 9th Youth In Film Awards ceremony (1987), the 10th Youth in Film Awards ceremony (1988), and the 15th Youth in Film Awards ceremony (1993). During these three years, the Young Artist Association split the category into a total of four sub-categories; "Best Young Male Superstar in a Motion Picture", "Best Young Actor in a Motion Picture: Drama", "Best Young Actor in a Motion Picture: Comedy or Fantasy", and "Best Young Actor in a Motion Picture: Horror or Mystery" (all listed on this page). However, the association would once again "merge" these various sub-categories back together after the 15th Youth in Film Awards.

Beginning with the 14th Youth in Film Awards, the association once again split the category, this time creating a new category to recognize young film actors age 10 and under in their own separate category. The "Best Young Actor Age 10 and Under in a Feature Film" category (not listed on this page) would become a permanent fixture of the Young Artist Awards and, as of 2012, is still awarded annually. Despite the creation of the "10 and Under" category, some "leading" young actors under the age of 10 have continued to be nominated as "Best Leading Young Actor in a Feature Film".

== Superlatives ==
Although today the Young Artist Association has strict age requirements regarding which nominees are eligible for a Young Artist Award nomination, the association did not originally have such specific age restrictions. Today, candidates eligible for a Young Artist Award nomination must be between the ages of 5 and 21 at the time of principal production of the project for which they are nominated. However, the eldest winner of the "Best Young Actor in a Feature Film" award is Dennis Christopher, who was 23 years old the night he won for his performance in Breaking Away at the 1st Youth in Film Awards ceremony (1979). The youngest winner of a "Best Leading Young Actor in a Feature Film" award is Mason Gamble, who was 8 years old the night he won for his performance in Dennis the Menace at the 15th Youth in Film Awards ceremony (1993).

The following list of superlatives is of winners/nominees in the "Best Leading Young Actor in a Feature Film" category. Wins/nominations in other Young Artist Award feature film categories, such as "Best Supporting Young Actor in a Feature Film", "Best Young Actor Age 10 and Under in a Feature Film", and "Best Leading Young Actor in an International Feature Film", are not included.

Superlative winners/nominees are listed alphabetically.

Superlative	Actor	Wins	Nominations
Actors with most "Best Leading Young Actor in a Feature Film" wins	Sean Astin	2 wins	2 nominations
Actors with most "Best Leading Young Actor in a Feature Film" wins	Corey Feldman	2 wins	2 nominations
Actors with most "Best Leading Young Actor in a Feature Film" wins	Josh Hutcherson	2 wins	4 nominations
Actors with most "Best Leading Young Actor in a Feature Film" nominations	Josh Hutcherson	2 wins	4 nominations
Actors with most "Best Leading Young Actor in a Feature Film" nominations	Haley Joel Osment	1 win	4 nominations
Actors with most "Best Leading Young Actor in a Feature Film" nominations	Elijah Wood	1 win	4 nominations
Actor with most "Best Leading Young Actor in a Feature Film" nominations (without winning)	Freddie Highmore	0 wins	4 nominations

== Winners and nominees ==
For the first twenty-three ceremonies, due to the numerous "Television" awards also presented by the Young Artist Association, the eligibility period spanned two calendar years to recognize the traditional television season. For example, the 1st Youth in Film Awards, presented in October 1979, recognized performers who appeared on television shows and in feature films that were released between September 1, 1978, and August 31, 1979. Starting with the 24th Young Artist Awards, presented in March 2003, the period of eligibility became the full previous calendar year, from January 1 to December 31, similar to the eligibility requirement used by the Academy Awards.

Following the Young Artist Association's practice, the films below are listed by year of their qualifying run, which is the year the film was released in the United States, and not by the date of the ceremony, which has traditionally taken place the following calendar year beginning with the 10th Youth in Film Awards ceremony which recognized performances during the 1987/1988 season and took place in 1989.

★ Winners are listed first and highlighted in gold, followed by the other nominees in the category for that year.

=== 1970s ===
Year	Actor	Film	Studio
1978 / 1979 (1st)
1978 / 1979 (1st)	★ Dennis Christopher	Breaking Away	20th Century Fox
1978 / 1979 (1st)	Thelonious Bernard	A Little Romance	Warner Bros.
1978 / 1979 (1st)	Panchito Gomez	Walk Proud	Universal Studios
1978 / 1979 (1st)	Jeremy Levy	Rich Kids	United Artists
1978 / 1979 (1st)	Ricky Schroder	The Champ	Metro-Goldwyn-Mayer

=== 1980s ===
Year	Actor	Film	Studio
1979 / 1980 (2nd)
1979 / 1980 (2nd)	★ Justin Henry	Kramer vs. Kramer	Columbia Pictures
1979 / 1980 (2nd)	Christopher Atkins	The Blue Lagoon	Columbia Pictures
1979 / 1980 (2nd)	Matt Dillon	My Bodyguard	20th Century Fox
1979 / 1980 (2nd)	Paul McCrane	Fame	Metro-Goldwyn-Mayer
1979 / 1980 (2nd)	Barry Miller	Fame	Metro-Goldwyn-Mayer
1979 / 1980 (2nd)	Ricky Schroder	The Last Flight of Noah's Ark	Walt Disney Pictures
1980 / 1981 (3rd)
1980 / 1981 (3rd)	★ Ricky Schroder	The Earthling	Filmways Pictures
1980 / 1981 (3rd)	Martin Hewitt	Endless Love	PolyGram Filmed Entertainment
1980 / 1981 (3rd)	Otto Rechenberg	Amy	Walt Disney Pictures
1980 / 1981 (3rd)	Paul Schoeman	Child's Play	American Film Institute
1980 / 1981 (3rd)	Gabriel Swann	Why Would I Lie?	Metro-Goldwyn-Mayer
1980 / 1981 (3rd)	Henry Thomas	Raggedy Man	Universal Pictures
1981 / 1982 (4th)
1981 / 1982 (4th)	★ Henry Thomas	E.T. the Extra-Terrestrial	Universal Pictures
1981 / 1982 (4th)	Matt Dillon	Tex	Walt Disney Pictures
1981 / 1982 (4th)	Doug McKeon	Night Crossing	Walt Disney Pictures
1982 / 1983 (5th)
1982 / 1983 (5th)	★ C. Thomas Howell	The Outsiders	Warner Bros.
1982 / 1983 (5th)	Torquil Campbell	The Golden Seal	The Samuel Goldwyn Company
1982 / 1983 (5th)	Sebastian Duncan	Man, Woman and Child	Paramount Pictures
1982 / 1983 (5th)	Frederick Koehler	Mr. Mom	20th Century Fox
1982 / 1983 (5th)	Kelly Reno	The Black Stallion Returns	Metro-Goldwyn-Mayer
1983 / 1984 (6th)
1983 / 1984 (6th)	★ Anthony Michael Hall	Sixteen Candles	Universal Pictures
1983 / 1984 (6th)	Peter Billingsley	A Christmas Story	MGM/UA
1983 / 1984 (6th)	Ross Harris	Testament	Paramount Pictures
1983 / 1984 (6th)	Noah Hathaway	The NeverEnding Story	Warner Bros.
1983 / 1984 (6th)	Barret Oliver	The NeverEnding Story	Warner Bros.
1983 / 1984 (6th)	Jason Presson	The Stone Boy	20th Century Fox
1983 / 1984 (6th)	Byron Thames	Heart Like a Wheel	20th Century Fox
1983 / 1984 (6th)	Henry Thomas	Cloak & Dagger	Universal Studios
1984 / 1985 (7th)
1984 / 1985 (7th)	★ Sean Astin	The Goonies	Warner Bros.
1984 / 1985 (7th)	Hunter Carson	Paris, Texas	20th Century Fox
1984 / 1985 (7th)	Lukas Haas	Witness	Paramount Pictures
1984 / 1985 (7th)	Ethan Hawke	Explorers	Paramount Pictures
1984 / 1985 (7th)	Jason Lively	National Lampoon's European Vacation	Warner Bros.
1984 / 1985 (7th)	Barret Oliver	D.A.R.Y.L.	Paramount Pictures
1985 / 1986 (8th)
1985 / 1986 (8th)	★ Peter Billingsley	The Dirt Bike Kid	Trinity Pictures
1985 / 1986 (8th)	Chad Allen	TerrorVision	Empire International Pictures
1985 / 1986 (8th)	Brandon Douglas	Papa Was a Preacher	La Rose Productions
1985 / 1986 (8th)	Scott Grimes	Critters	New Line Cinema
1985 / 1986 (8th)	Corey Haim	Lucas	20th Century Fox
1985 / 1986 (8th)	Bobby Jacoby	The Zoo Gang	New World Pictures
1986 / 1987 (9th)
1986 / 1987 (9th)	★Superstar: River Phoenix	The Mosquito Coast	Warner Bros.
1986 / 1987 (9th)	Corey Haim	The Lost Boys	Warner Bros.
1986 / 1987 (9th)	David Mendenhall	Over the Top	Cannon Films
1986 / 1987 (9th)	★Drama: Fred Savage	The Princess Bride	20th Century Fox
1986 / 1987 (9th)	Harley Cross	The Believers	Orion Pictures
1986 / 1987 (9th)	Joshua Miller	River's Edge	Hemdale/Island Pictures
1986 / 1987 (9th)	Jacob Vargas	The Principal	TriStar Pictures
1986 / 1987 (9th)	Joshua Zuehlke	Amazing Grace and Chuck	TriStar Pictures
1986 / 1987 (9th)	★Comedy: Patrick Dempsey	Can't Buy Me Love	Touchstone Pictures
1986 / 1987 (9th)	Ricky Busker	Big Shots	Lorimar/20th Century Fox
1986 / 1987 (9th)	Keith Coogan	Adventures in Babysitting	Buena Vista/Touchstone Pictures
1986 / 1987 (9th)	Darius McCrary	Big Shots	Lorimar/20th Century Fox
1986 / 1987 (9th)	Joshua Rudoy	Harry and the Hendersons	Universal Studios
1986 / 1987 (9th)	★Horror: Corey Feldman	The Lost Boys	Warner Bros.
1986 / 1987 (9th)	Stephen Dorff	The Gate	Alliance Entertainment
1986 / 1987 (9th)	Michael Sharrett	Deadly Friend	Warner Bros.
1987 / 1988 (10th)
1987 / 1988 (10th)	★Drama: Christian Bale	Empire of the Sun	Warner Bros.
1987 / 1988 (10th)	Warwick Davis	Willow	Metro-Goldwyn-Mayer
1987 / 1988 (10th)	Kevin Dillon	The Rescue	Touchstone Pictures
1987 / 1988 (10th)	Roland Harrah III	Braddock: Missing in Action III	Cannon Films
1987 / 1988 (10th)	Neil Patrick Harris	Clara's Heart	Warner Bros.
1987 / 1988 (10th)	Sebastian Rice-Edwards	Hope and Glory	Columbia Pictures
1987 / 1988 (10th)	★Comedy/Fantasy: Corey Feldman (tie)	License to Drive	20th Century Fox
1987 / 1988 (10th)	★Comedy/Fantasy: Corey Haim (tie)	License to Drive	20th Century Fox
1987 / 1988 (10th)	Jade Calegory	Mac and Me	Orion Pictures
1987 / 1988 (10th)	David Moscow	Big	20th Century Fox
1987 / 1988 (10th)	Jared Rushton	Big	20th Century Fox
1987 / 1988 (10th)	Jamie Wild	Overboard	Metro-Goldwyn-Mayer
1987 / 1988 (10th)	★Horror/Mystery: Lukas Haas	Lady in White	New Century Vista Film Company
1987 / 1988 (10th)	Rodney Eastman	A Nightmare on Elm Street 4: The Dream Master	New Line Cinema
1987 / 1988 (10th)	Ricky Paull Goldin	The Blob	TriStar Pictures
1987 / 1988 (10th)	Andras Jones	A Nightmare on Elm Street 4: The Dream Master	New Line Cinema
1987 / 1988 (10th)	Michael Kenworthy	Return of the Living Dead Part II	Lorimar
1987 / 1988 (10th)	Kieran O'Brien	Bellman and True	Island Pictures
1988 / 1989 (11th)
1988 / 1989 (11th)	★ Sean Astin	Staying Together	Hemdale Film Corporation
1988 / 1989 (11th)	Kirk Cameron	Listen to Me	Columbia Pictures
1988 / 1989 (11th)	Joel Carlson	Communion	New Line Cinema
1988 / 1989 (11th)	Keith Coogan	Cheetah	Walt Disney Pictures
1988 / 1989 (11th)	Cory Danziger	The 'Burbs	Universal Studios
1988 / 1989 (11th)	Joshua Miller	Teen Witch	Metro-Goldwyn-Mayer
1988 / 1989 (11th)	Leaf Phoenix	Parenthood	Universal Pictures
1988 / 1989 (11th)	Jared Rushton	Honey, I Shrunk the Kids	Walt Disney Pictures
1988 / 1989 (11th)	Ben Savage	Little Monsters	Vestron Pictures
1988 / 1989 (11th)	Fred Savage	The Wizard	Universal Pictures

=== 1990s ===
Year	Actor	Film	Studio
1989 / 1990 (12th)
1989 / 1990 (12th)	★ Macaulay Culkin	Home Alone	20th Century Fox
1989 / 1990 (12th)	Balthazar Getty	Lord of the Flies	Columbia Pictures
1989 / 1990 (12th)	Charlie Korsmo	Dick Tracy	Touchstone Pictures
1989 / 1990 (12th)	Joshua Miller	Class of 1999	Lightning Pictures
1989 / 1990 (12th)	Elijah Wood	Avalon	TriStar Pictures
1990 / 1991 (13th)
1990 / 1991 (13th)	★ Ethan Randall-Embry	Dutch	20th Century Fox
1990 / 1991 (13th)	Jonathan Brandis	The NeverEnding Story II: The Next Chapter	Warner Bros.
1990 / 1991 (13th)	Balthazar Getty	My Heroes Have Always Been Cowboys	The Samuel Goldwyn Company
1990 / 1991 (13th)	Lukas Haas	Rambling Rose	Seven Arts Pictures
1990 / 1991 (13th)	Stian Smestad	Shipwrecked	Walt Disney Pictures
1990 / 1991 (13th)	Robert J. Steinmiller Jr.	Bingo	TriStar Pictures
1990 / 1991 (13th)	Elijah Wood	Paradise	Interscope/Touchstone Pictures
1991 / 1992 (14th)
1991 / 1992 (14th)	★ Elijah Wood	Radio Flyer	Columbia Pictures
1991 / 1992 (14th)	Jonathan Brandis	Ladybugs	Paramount Pictures
1991 / 1992 (14th)	Christopher Castile	Beethoven	Universal Studios
1991 / 1992 (14th)	Christian Coleman	South Central	Warner Bros.
1991 / 1992 (14th)	Stephen Dorff	The Power of One	Warner Bros.
1991 / 1992 (14th)	Joshua John Miller	And You Thought Your Parents Were Weird	Trimark Pictures
1991 / 1992 (14th)	Robert Oliveri	Honey, I Blew Up the Kid	Walt Disney Pictures
1991 / 1992 (14th)	Ethan Randall-Embry	All I Want for Christmas	Paramount Pictures
1991 / 1992 (14th)	Benjamin Salisbury	Captain Ron	Touchstone Pictures
1992 / 1993 (15th)
1992 / 1993 (15th)	★Drama: Edward Furlong (tie)	A Home of Our Own	Gramercy Pictures
1992 / 1993 (15th)	★Drama: Jason James Richter (tie)	Free Willy	Warner Bros.
1992 / 1993 (15th)	Jesse Bradford	King of the Hill	Universal Pictures
1992 / 1993 (15th)	Andrew Knott	The Secret Garden	Warner Bros.
1992 / 1993 (15th)	Austin O'Brien	Last Action Hero	Columbia Pictures
1992 / 1993 (15th)	Heydon Prowse	The Secret Garden	Warner Bros.
1992 / 1993 (15th)	Ernie Reyes Jr.	Surf Ninjas	New Line Cinema
1992 / 1993 (15th)	Robert J. Steinmiller Jr.	Jack the Bear	20th Century Fox
1992 / 1993 (15th)	★Comedy: Mason Gamble	Dennis the Menace	Warner Bros.
1992 / 1993 (15th)	Omri Katz	Hocus Pocus	Walt Disney Pictures
1992 / 1993 (15th)	David Krumholtz	Life with Mikey	Touchstone Pictures
1992 / 1993 (15th)	Sean Murray	Hocus Pocus	Walt Disney Pictures
1992 / 1993 (15th)	David Netter	One Good Cop	Hollywood Pictures
1992 / 1993 (15th)	Michael Oliver	Problem Child 2	Universal Studios
1993 / 1994 (16th)
1993 / 1994 (16th)	★ Brad Renfro	The Client	Warner Bros.
1993 / 1994 (16th)	Sean Nelson	Fresh	Miramax Films
1993 / 1994 (16th)	Austin O'Brien	My Girl 2	Columbia Pictures
1993 / 1994 (16th)	Elijah Wood	North	Universal Pictures
1994 / 1995 (17th)
1994 / 1995 (17th)	★ Wil Horneff	Born to Be Wild	Warner Bros.
1994 / 1995 (17th)	Jerry Barone	Two Bits	Miramax Films
1994 / 1995 (17th)	Jesse Bradford	Far From Home: The Adventures of Yellow Dog	20th Century Fox
1994 / 1995 (17th)	Joseph Mazzello & Brad Renfro	The Cure	Universal Pictures
1994 / 1995 (17th)	Hal Scardino	The Indian in the Cupboard	Columbia Pictures/Paramount Pictures
1994 / 1995 (17th)	Ryan Slater	The Amazing Panda Adventure	Warner Bros.
1994 / 1995 (17th)	Jonathan Taylor Thomas	Tom and Huck	Walt Disney Pictures
1995 / 1996 (18th)
1995 / 1996 (18th)	★ Lucas Black	Sling Blade	Miramax Films
1995 / 1996 (18th)	Kevin Bishop	Muppet Treasure Island	Jim Henson Prods./Walt Disney Pictures
1995 / 1996 (18th)	Kyle Howard	House Arrest	Metro-Goldwyn-Mayer
1995 / 1996 (18th)	Vincent Kartheiser	Alaska	Castle Rock Entertainment
1995 / 1996 (18th)	Joe Perrino	Sleepers	PolyGram Filmed Entertainment
1996 / 1997 (19th)
1996 / 1997 (19th)	★ Blake Heron (tie)	Shiloh	Legacy Releasing/Warner Bros.
1996 / 1997 (19th)	★ Kevin Zegers (tie)	Air Bud	Walt Disney Pictures
1996 / 1997 (19th)	Blake Foster	Turbo: A Power Rangers Movie	Saban Entertainment/20th Century Fox
1996 / 1997 (19th)	Brandon Hammond	Soul Food	20th Century Fox
1996 / 1997 (19th)	Mario Yedidia	Warriors of Virtue	China Film Co-Prod. Corp./MGM
1997 / 1998 (20th)
1997 / 1998 (20th)	★ Miko Hughes	Mercury Rising	Universal Pictures
1997 / 1998 (20th)	Michael Caloz	Little Men	Warner Bros.
1997 / 1998 (20th)	Joseph Cross	Wide Awake	Miramax Films
1997 / 1998 (20th)	Kieran Culkin	The Mighty	Miramax Films
1997 / 1998 (20th)	Kyle Gibson	True Friends	2nd Generation Films
1997 / 1998 (20th)	Joseph Mazzello	Simon Birch	Hollywood Pictures
1997 / 1998 (20th)	Eamonn Owens	The Butcher Boy	Warner Bros.
1997 / 1998 (20th)	Gregory Smith	Small Soldiers	DreamWorks
1997 / 1998 (20th)	Ian Michael Smith	Simon Birch	Hollywood Pictures
1997 / 1998 (20th)	Kevin Zegers	Air Bud: Golden Receiver	Keystone Pictures
1998 / 1999 (21st)
1998 / 1999 (21st)	★ Haley Joel Osment	The Sixth Sense	Spyglass Ent./Hollywood Pictures
1998 / 1999 (21st)	Lucas Black	Crazy in Alabama	Columbia Pictures
1998 / 1999 (21st)	Jeremy Blackman	Magnolia	New Line Cinema
1998 / 1999 (21st)	Noah Fleiss	Joe the King	Trimark Pictures
1998 / 1999 (21st)	Jake Gyllenhaal	October Sky	Universal Pictures

=== 2000s ===
Year	Actor	Film	Studio
1999 / 2000 (22nd)
1999 / 2000 (22nd)	★ Rob Brown	Finding Forrester	Columbia Pictures
1999 / 2000 (22nd)	Patrick Fugit	Almost Famous	DreamWorks SKG
1999 / 2000 (22nd)	Ryan Merriman	Just Looking	Sony Pictures Classics
1999 / 2000 (22nd)	Haley Joel Osment	Pay It Forward	Warner Bros.
1999 / 2000 (22nd)	Kevin Zegers	MVP: Most Valuable Primate	Keystone Family Pictures
2000 / 2001 (23rd)
2000 / 2001 (23rd)	★ Anton Yelchin	Hearts in Atlantis	Warner Bros.
2000 / 2001 (23rd)	Blake Foster	Kids World	Blue Steel Releasing
2000 / 2001 (23rd)	Trevor Morgan	The Glass House	Columbia Pictures
2000 / 2001 (23rd)	Camden Munson	In the Bedroom	Miramax Films
2000 / 2001 (23rd)	Haley Joel Osment	A.I.: Artificial Intelligence	DreamWorks
2000 / 2001 (23rd)	Alexander Pollock	Cats & Dogs	Warner Bros.
2002 (24th)
2002 (24th)	★ Tyler Hoechlin	Road to Perdition	DreamWorks/20th Century Fox
2002 (24th)	Jamie Bell	Nicholas Nickleby	MGM/UA
2002 (24th)	Rory Culkin	Signs	Buena Vista Pictures
2002 (24th)	Nicholas Hoult	About A Boy	Studio Canal/Universal Studios
2002 (24th)	Lil' Bow Wow	Like Mike	20th Century Fox
2002 (24th)	Matthew O'Leary	Frailty	Lions Gate Entertainment
2002 (24th)	Mark Rendall	Touching Wild Horses	Animal Tales Productions
2003 (25th)
2003 (25th)	★ Jeremy Sumpter	Peter Pan	Universal Studios
2003 (25th)	Liam Aiken	Good Boy!	Jim Henson Productions
2003 (25th)	David Henrie	Arizona Summer	WestPark Productions
2003 (25th)	Shia LaBeouf	Holes	Walt Disney Pictures
2003 (25th)	Frankie Muniz	Agent Cody Banks	Metro-Goldwyn-Mayer
2003 (25th)	Haley Joel Osment	Secondhand Lions	New Line Cinema
2004 (26th)
2004 (26th)	★ Jamie Bell	Undertow	MGM/UA
2004 (26th)	Liam Aiken	Lemony Snicket's A Series of Unfortunate Events	Paramount Pictures/DreamWorks
2004 (26th)	Rory Culkin	Mean Creek	Paramount Classics
2004 (26th)	Freddie Highmore	Finding Neverland	Miramax Films
2004 (26th)	Bobby Preston	Motocross Kids	Tag Entertainment
2005 (27th)
2005 (27th)	★ Josh Hutcherson	Zathura: A Space Adventure	Columbia Pictures
2005 (27th)	Adam Butcher	Saint Ralph	Alliance Atlantis
2005 (27th)	Freddie Highmore	Charlie and the Chocolate Factory	Warner Bros.
2005 (27th)	Taylor Lautner	The Adventures of Sharkboy and Lavagirl in 3-D	Columbia Pictures
2005 (27th)	William Moseley	The Chronicles of Narnia: The Lion, the Witch and the Wardrobe	Walt Disney Pictures
2006 (28th)
2006 (28th)	★ Logan Lerman	Hoot	New Line Cinema
2006 (28th)	Cameron Bright	Running Scared	Media 8 Entertainment
2006 (28th)	Conor Donovan	Twelve and Holding	Echo Lake Productions
2006 (28th)	Josh Hutcherson	RV	Columbia Pictures/Sony Pictures
2006 (28th)	Alex Neuberger	Running Scared	Media 8 Entertainment
2006 (28th)	Thomas Sangster	Nanny McPhee	Universal Pictures
2007 (29th)
2007 (29th)	★ Josh Hutcherson	Bridge to Terabithia	Buena Vista Pictures
2007 (29th)	Alex Etel	The Water Horse	Columbia Pictures
2007 (29th)	Miles Heizer	Rails & Ties	Warner Bros.
2007 (29th)	Freddie Highmore	August Rush	Warner Bros.
2007 (29th)	Jacob Kogan	Joshua	Fox Searchlight Pictures
2007 (29th)	Logan Lerman	3:10 to Yuma	Lionsgate
2007 (29th)	Zach Mills	Mr. Magorium's Wonder Emporium	20th Century Fox
2007 (29th)	Alex Neuberger	Underdog	Buena Vista Pictures
2007 (29th)	Chris O'Neil	The Last Mimzy	New Line Cinema
2007 (29th)	Alejandro Polanco	Chop Shop	Koch-Lorber Films
2008 (30th)
2008 (30th)	★ Nate Hartley	Drillbit Taylor	Paramount Pictures
2008 (30th)	Freddie Highmore	The Spiderwick Chronicles	Paramount Pictures
2008 (30th)	Josh Hutcherson	Journey to the Center of the Earth	Warner Bros.
2008 (30th)	Skandar Keynes	The Chronicles of Narnia: Prince Caspian	Walt Disney Pictures
2009 (31st)
2009 (31st)	★ Max Records	Where The Wild Things Are	Warner Bros.
2009 (31st)	Jake T. Austin	Hotel for Dogs	DreamWorks/Paramount Pictures
2009 (31st)	Jimmy Bennett	Alabama Moon	Alabama Moon Entertainment
2009 (31st)	Devon Bostick	Adoration	Ego Film Arts
2009 (31st)	Taylor Lautner	The Twilight Saga: New Moon	Imprint Entertainment

=== 2010s ===
Year	Actor	Film	Studio
2010 (32nd)
2010 (32nd)	★ Jaden Smith	The Karate Kid	Columbia Pictures
2010 (32nd)	Zachary Gordon	Diary of a Wimpy Kid	20th Century Fox
2010 (32nd)	Noah Ringer	The Last Airbender	Paramount Pictures
2010 (32nd)	Eros Vlahos	Nanny McPhee and the Big Bang	Universal Studios
2011 (33rd)
2011 (33rd)	★ Dakota Goyo	Real Steel	Walt Disney Pictures
2011 (33rd)	Asa Butterfield	Hugo	Columbia Pictures
2011 (33rd)	Joel Courtney	Super 8	Paramount Pictures
2011 (33rd)	Nathan Gamble	Dolphin Tale	Warner Bros.
2011 (33rd)	Brian Gilbert	The Son of No One	Anchor Bay Entertainment
2011 (33rd)	Zachary Gordon	Diary of a Wimpy Kid: Rodrick Rules	20th Century Fox
2011 (33rd)	José Julián	A Better Life	Summit Entertainment
2012 (34th)
2012 (34th)	★ Tom Holland	The Impossible	Warner Bros.
2012 (34th)	Jared Gilman	Moonrise Kingdom	Focus Features
2012 (34th)	Zachary Gordon	Diary of a Wimpy Kid: Dog Days	Fox 2000
2012 (34th)	Quinn Lord	Imaginaerum	Nordisk Films
2012 (34th)	Jason Spevack	Jesus Henry Christ	Entertainment One
2012 (34th)	Christian Traeumer	The Child	Stealth Media Group
2013 (35th)
2013 (35th)	★ Miles Elliot	Camp	Roebuck Media
2013 (35th)	Skylan Brooks	The Inevitable Defeat of Mister & Pete	Lionsgate Entertainment
2013 (35th)	Chandler Canterbury	Standing Up	Aldamisa Entertainment
2013 (35th)	Liam James	The Way Way Back	OddLot Entertainment
2013 (35th)	Maxim Knight	Medeas	Keyhole Productions

== See also ==
- Academy Juvenile Award
- Broadcast Film Critics Association Award for Best Young Performer
- Saturn Award for Best Performance by a Younger Actor
- Young Artist Award for Best Leading Young Actress in a Feature Film
