= 1st Youth in Film Awards =

1979 US media awards ceremony

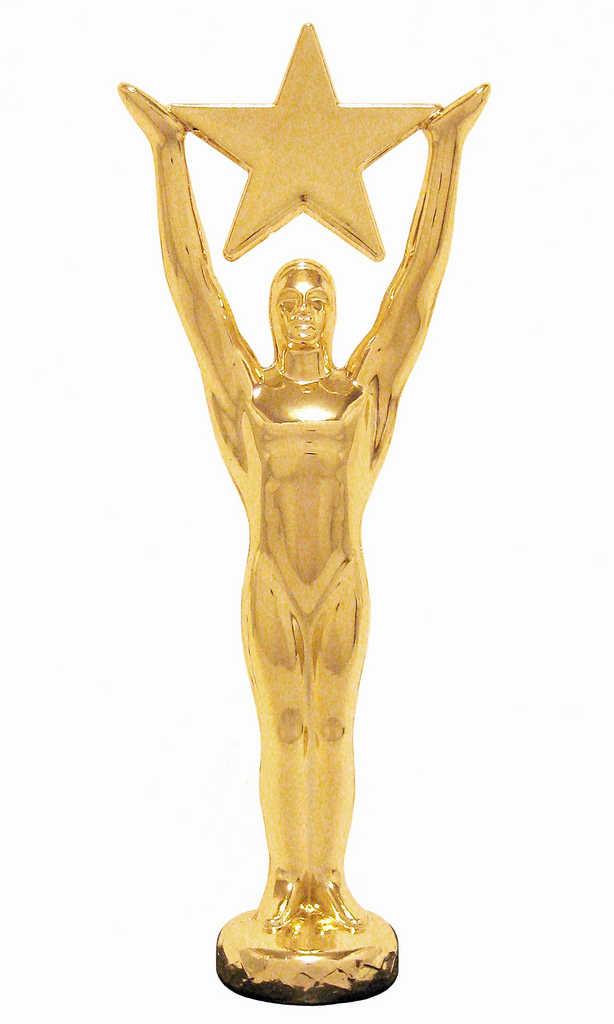
- Awarded for: Achievement in 1978—1979 season
- Date: October 1979
- Site: Sheraton Universal Hotel; Universal City, California
- Hosted by: Gary Coleman

The 1st Youth in Film Awards ceremony (now known as the Young Artist Awards), presented by the Youth in Film Association, honored outstanding youth performers in the fields of film, television and music for the 1978–1979 season, and took place in October 1979 at the Sheraton Universal Hotel in Universal City, California.

Established in 1978 by long-standing Hollywood Foreign Press Association member, Maureen Dragone, the Youth in Film Association was the first organization to establish an awards ceremony specifically set to recognize and award the contributions of performers under the age of 21 in the fields of film, television, theater and music.

Although the Youth in Film Awards were conceived as a way to primarily recognize youth performers under the age of 18, the eldest winner in a competitive category at the 1st annual ceremony was Dennis Christopher who was 23 years old on the night he won as Best Juvenile Actor in a Motion Picture for his performance in Breaking Away.

== Categories ==
★ Bold indicates the winner in each category.

== Best Young Performer in a Feature Film ==
=== Best Juvenile Actor in A Motion Picture ===
★ Dennis Christopher – Breaking Away – 20th Century Fox as Dave Stohler

- Thelonious Bernard – A Little Romance – Warner Bros as Daniel Michon
- Panchito Gomez – Walk Proud – Universal as Manuel
- Jeremy Levy – Rich Kids – United Artists as Jamie Harris
- Ricky Schroder – The Champ – MGM as Timothy Joseph "T.J." Flynn

=== Best Juvenile Actress in A Motion Picture ===
★ Diane Lane – A Little Romance – Warner Bros as Lauren King

- Trini Alvarado – Rich Kids – United Artists as Franny Phillips
- Mariel Hemingway – Manhattan – United Artists as Tracy
- Patsy Kensit – Hanover Street – Columbia as Sarah Sellinger
- Brooke Shields – Just You and Me, Kid – Columbia as Kate
- Cindy Smith – Benji's Very Own Christmas Story – Mulberry Square as Cindy Chapman

== Best Young Performer in a TV Series or Special ==
=== Best Juvenile Actor in A TV Series or Special ===
★ Adam Rich – Eight is Enough – ABC as Nicholas Bradford

- Willie Aames – Eight is Enough – ABC as Thomas "Tommy" Bradford Jr.
- Shaun Cassidy – Like Normal People – ABC as Roger Meyers
- Gary Coleman – Diff'rent Strokes – NBC as Arnold Jackson
- Noah Hathaway – Battlestar Galactica – Universal as Boxey

=== Best Juvenile Actress in a TV Series or Special ===
★ Charlene Tilton – Dallas (Royal Marriage segment) – CBS as Lucy Ewing Cooper

- Danielle Brisebois – All in the Family – CBS as Stephanie Mills
- Quinn Cummings – Family – ABC as Annie Cooper
- Melissa Gilbert – Little House on the Prairie – NBC as Laura Ingalls Wilder
- Kristy McNichol – Family – ABC as Letitia “Buddy” Lawrence

== Best Young Performer in a TV Daytime Series ==
=== Best Juvenile Actor in A Daytime Series ===
★ Meegan King – Days of Our Lives – NBC as Pete Curtis

- Shawn Campbell – The Doctors – NBC as Billy Aldrich
- Mikey Martin – Days of Our Lives – NBC as Dougie LeClair

=== Best Juvenile Actress in A Daytime Series ===
★ Tracey Bregman – Days of Our Lives – NBC as Donna Temple Craig

- Genie Francis – General Hospital – ABC as Laura Spencer
- Natasha Ryan – Days of Our Lives – NBC as Hope Williams

== Best Young Musical Recording Artist ==
=== Best Juvenile Musical Recording Artist – Male ===
★ Michael Jackson – Off the Wall – Epic

- Shaun Cassidy – Room Service – Warner Bros.
- Jimmy Osmond (with The Osmonds) – Steppin' Out – Mercury

=== Best Juvenile Musical Recording Artist – Female ===
★ Evelyn "Champagne" King – Shame – RCA

- Marie Osmond (with The Osmonds) – Steppin' Out – Mercury

== Best Entertainment Featuring Youth ==
=== Best Motion Picture Featuring Youth ===
★ A Little Romance – WB

- Breaking Away – 20th Century Fox
- The Champ – MGM
- Nutcracker Fantasy – Sanrio Communications
- The Muppet Movie – Marble Arch

=== Best TV Series or Special Featuring Youth ===
★ Eight is Enough – ABC

- Benji's Very Own Christmas Story – Mulberry Square
- Diff'rent Strokes – NBC
- Little House on the Prairie – NBC
- The Waltons – CBS

=== Best Musical Entertainment Featuring Youth – TV or Motion Picture ===
★ Nutcracker Fantasy – Sanrio Communications

- Hair – United Artists
- Sha Na Na – NBC
- Sleeping Beauty 1979 re-release – Disney
- The Muppet Movie – Marble Arch

== Special awards ==
=== Jane Withers Award ===
==== Best Juvenile Comedian ====
★ Gary Coleman – Diff'rent Strokes – NBC as Arnold Jackson

=== The Sybil Jason Award ===
==== Best Juvenile Actress in a Motion Picture ====
★ Diane Lane – A Little Romance – WB as Lauren King

=== The Jackie Coogan Award ===
==== Best Juvenile Actor in a Motion Picture ====
★ Thelonious Bernard – A Little Romance – WB as Daniel Michon

=== Former Child Star Lifetime Achievement Award ===
★ Jane Withers
