= A Little Romance =

1979 film by George Roy Hill

- Theatrical release poster
- Directed by: George Roy Hill
- Screenplay by: Allan Burns; George Roy Hill
- Based on: E=mc2 Mon Amour; 1977 novel by Patrick Cauvin
- Produced by: Robert L. Crawford; Yves Rousset-Rouard
- Starring: Laurence Olivier; Diane Lane; Arthur Hill; Sally Kellerman; Thelonious Bernard
- Cinematography: Pierre-William Glenn
- Edited by: William H. Reynolds
- Music by: Georges Delerue
- Distributed by: Orion Pictures (through Warner Bros.)
- Release date: April 27, 1979 (USA)
- Running time: 108 minutes
- Countries: United States; France
- Languages: English; French; Italian
- Budget: $3 million

A Little Romance is a 1979 American romantic comedy film directed by George Roy Hill and starring Laurence Olivier, Thelonious Bernard, and 13-year-old Diane Lane in her film debut. The screenplay was written by Allan Burns and George Roy Hill, based on the novel E=mc^{2} Mon Amour (1977) by Patrick Cauvin.

The original music score was composed by Georges Delerue. The film follows a French boy and an American girl who meet in Paris and begin a romance that leads to a journey to Venice where they hope to seal their love forever with a kiss beneath the Bridge of Sighs at sunset.

The film won the 1979 Academy Award for Best Original Score for Georges Delerue and received an additional nomination for Best Adapted Screenplay for Allan Burns. It also received two Golden Globe Award nominations for Best Supporting Actor for Laurence Olivier and Best Original Score for Delerue. As the film's young leads, Thelonious Bernard and Diane Lane both received Young Artist Award nominations as Best Actor and Best Actress respectively, as well as earning the film a win as Best Motion Picture Featuring Youth. It was the first film produced by Orion Pictures.

== Plot ==
Lauren King, a book-smart and affluent 13-year-old girl from the United States, lives in Paris with her mother Kay and stepfather Richard. Daniel Michon, a "street-smart" and movie-loving 13-year-old French boy, lives with his taxi-driver father. The two meet and fall in love in the Château de Vaux-le-Vicomte, where Kay is becoming romantically interested in movie director George de Marco. Daniel and Lauren meet Julius Santorin, a quirky elderly man, in an accident. Daniel is unimpressed, but Julius fascinates Lauren with stories of his life, telling of a tradition that if a couple kiss in a gondola beneath the Bridge of Sighs in Venice at sunset while the church bells toll, they will be in love forever. At a party, which friends Londet and Natalie attend, Daniel punches George for making a crude suggestion at Lauren, so Kay forbids the two to date.

Since her family will return to the United States soon, Lauren hatches a plan to travel to Venice with Daniel. Though they have money from a horse race, they cannot cross the border without an adult. With Julius's help, the pair travel by train but miss their connection to Verona. In the meantime, Lauren's family spark an international investigation, believing she has been abducted.

They hitch a ride with Bob and Janet Duryea, tourists from the United States who are headed to Venice. In Verona, the travelers go out to dinner, where Bob discovers that his wallet has been stolen. Even though their horse-race winnings were left on the train in Julius' vest, Julius offers to pay the bill with cash, perplexing Lauren and irritating Daniel, who suspects he stole it. The following morning, the Duryeas notice Lauren's "missing child" picture in an Italian newspaper. Julius has also seen the paper and intercepts Lauren and Daniel on their way back to the hotel, angry that Lauren lied to him about their true reason for going to Venice and that everyone will think he is a kidnapper. Because they cannot return to the hotel, they join a bicycle race to escape Verona. When Julius falls behind, Lauren persuades Daniel to go back for him. They find him collapsed from exhaustion. Daniel worms his background out of Julius, who also confesses that he both picked Bob's pocket and stole the money for their train tickets, disappointing Lauren. Lauren then reveals that she will move back to the United States permanently in two weeks. She wanted to take a gondola to the Bridge of Sighs and kiss Daniel so they could love each other forever. She berates Julius by dismissing all his stories as lies. Julius admits he lied about some things but insists the legend can be true. Daniel decides he still wants to go to Venice with Lauren, and Julius joins them.

In Venice, they spend the night in St. Mark's Basilica, until a chance meeting with the Duryeas sets them on the run again hours before sunset. Julius hides them in a movie theater and gives them his remaining cash, promising to return a half-hour before sunset. However, when they are inside, Julius turns himself into the police searching for them; despite being attacked by an inspector, he refuses to reveal Lauren and Daniel's whereabouts. The two fall asleep during the film and wake with just a few minutes remaining. They manage to find a gondola and make it to the bridge in time to kiss while the bells are still pealing. In the police station, Julius reveals their whereabouts, assuming that they have accomplished their goal.

After some days pass, Lauren is preparing to leave for the United States. She notices Daniel standing across the street, waiting to say goodbye to her. Kay objects, but Richard allows her to go ahead. Pledging not to become “like everybody else”, Lauren and Daniel share a final kiss. She looks up and notices Julius (who apparently got all charges dropped) waving to her from a nearby bench. She rushes over, embraces him, and bids him farewell, then runs back to the car. As the car pulls away, Daniel and Lauren wave to each other for the last time, but Daniel runs after their car. When another car pulls in front of Daniel he leaps into the air so Lauren can see he is not far behind.

== Cast ==
- Laurence Olivier as Julius Edmund Santorin
- Diane Lane as Lauren King
- Thelonious Bernard as Daniel Michon
- Arthur Hill as Richard King
- Sally Kellerman as Kay King
- Broderick Crawford as himself
- David Dukes as George de Marco
- Andrew Duncan as Bob Duryea
- Claudette Sutherland as Janet Duryea
- Graham Fletcher-Cook as Londet
- Ashby Semple as Natalie Woodstein
- Claude Brosset as Michel Michon
- Jacques Maury as Inspector Leclerc
- Anna Massey as Ms Siegel
- Peter Maloney as Martin
- Dominique Lavanant as Mme. Cormier
- Mike Marshall as 1st Assistant Director
- Michel Bardinet as French Ambassador
- David Gabison as French Representative
- Isabel Duby as Monique
- Geoffrey Carey as Make-up Man
- John Pepper as 2nd Assistant Director
- Denise Glaser as Woman Critic
- Jeanne Herviale as Woman in Metro Station
- Carlo Lastricati as Tour Guide
- Judith Mullen as Richard's Secretary
- Philippe Brigaud as Theater Manager
- Lucienne Legrand as Theater Cashier

== Production ==
Filming took place in Paris, France, as well as Verona, Venice and Veneto, Italy. Throughout the film, the principle characters go to the cinema and watch The Big Sleep, True Grit, and Hustle, as well as George Roy Hill's two Robert Redford/Paul Newman buddy pictures, The Sting, and Butch Cassidy and the Sundance Kid. Clips of these films are shown, either subtitled or dubbed into French or Italian.

== Reception ==
Upon its release, A Little Romance received mixed opinions from critics. In his review in The New York Times, Vincent Canby described the film as "so ponderous it seems almost mean spirited. It's been a long time since I've seen a movie about boorish American tourists and felt sorry for the tourists—which is one of Mr. Hill's achievements here. I'm sure nothing mean-spirited was intended, but such is the film's effect. This may be the main hazard when one sets out to make a film so relentlessly sweet-tempered that it winds up—like Pollyana—alienating everyone not similarly affected." Roger Ebert of the Chicago Sun-Times gave the film two stars out of four and wrote that it "gives us two movie kids in a story so unlikely I assume it was intended as a fantasy. And it gives us dialog and situations so relentlessly cute we want to squirm." Dale Pollock of Variety wrote, "The first film out of Orion Pictures' stable, 'A Little Romance' emerges as a classy winner. A charming blend of youthful innocence and guile, though the George Roy Hill film will need careful marketing to find its desired audience, which is larger than many may suppose." Gene Siskel of the Chicago Tribune gave the film three stars out of four and called it "a beguiling light romantic comedy ... It's a credit to the film's young actors, director George Roy Hill, and the screenplay that we as adults manage to care for these kids." Charles Champlin of the Los Angeles Times stated, "If it's about something, I can't discern what it is. But the unpatronizing treatment of the young people and the strong appeal of the actors who play the parts make for an invigorating film." Judith Martin of The Washington Post wrote, "The intentional comedy in the film always seems on the verge of working, but then is quickly bludgeoned to death ... Several of the actors have genuinely satirical approaches to characters who are too weighted with clichés to allow lightness." David Ansen of Newsweek remarked, "In its sweet, witty and modestly sentimental way, it delivers the romantic frissons that many star-studded, would-be blockbusters of the heart lumber in vain to achieve."

In a retrospective review for DVD Movie Guide, David Williams called the film "one of those gems that doesn't seem too great on the surface, but manages to lift your spirits in such a way that when it's over, it makes you glad you ignored your initial feelings and checked it out anyway." Williams applauded the performances as "engaging from top-to-bottom", singling out Olivier's portrayal of Julius, the mischievous escort and matchmaker. In his review on Movie Metropolis, John J. Puccio wrote, "It's a lovely tale of pure and innocent love and the lengths that people involved in such a love will go to in their desire to ensure it. The movie can hardly fail to please even the most jaded audiences." In his review in DVD Talk, David Langdon concluded, "A Little Romance fits into that category we might call the children's film for adults. It's smart, well written, acted and directed. If anything it will be remembered as Diane Lane's first movie and one of Laurence Olivier's last. The DVD is above average in all categories except audio but it is worth a look."

On Rotten Tomatoes, the film has an approval rating of 72% based on reviews from 29 critics.

== Accolades ==
Award	Category	Recipient	Result
Academy Awards	Best Screenplay – Based on Material from Another Medium	Allan Burns	Nominated
Academy Awards	Best Original Score	Georges Delerue	Won
Golden Globe Awards	Best Supporting Actor – Motion Picture	Laurence Olivier	Nominated
Golden Globe Awards	Best Original Score – Motion Picture	Georges Delerue	Nominated
Writers Guild of America Awards	Best Comedy Adapted from Another Medium	Allan Burns	Nominated
Young Artist Awards	Best Motion Picture Featuring Youth		Won
Young Artist Awards	Best Juvenile Actor in A Motion Picture	Thelonious Bernard	Nominated
Young Artist Awards	Best Juvenile Actress in A Motion Picture	Diane Lane	Won
