= 9th Youth in Film Awards =

1987 US media awards ceremony

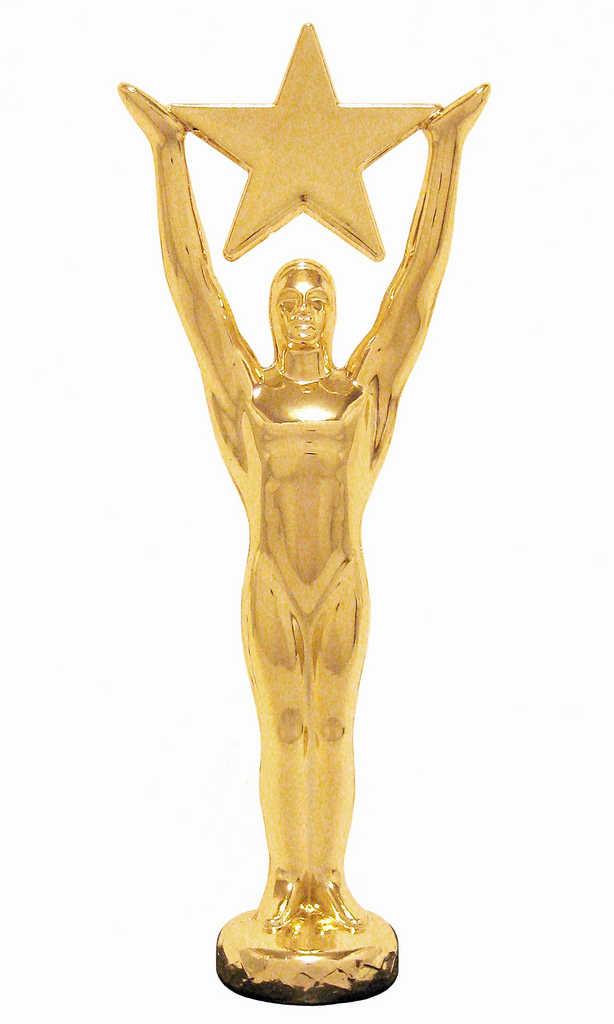
- Awarded for: Achievement in the 1986—1987 season
- Date: December 5, 1987
- Site: Hollywood Palladium; Hollywood, California
- Hosted by: Chad Allen and Patrick Dempsey

The 9th Youth in Film Awards ceremony (now known as the Young Artist Awards), presented by the Youth in Film Association, honored outstanding youth performers under the age of 21 in the fields of film, television and music for the 1986-1987 season, and took place on December 5, 1987, at the Hollywood Palladium in Hollywood, California.

Established in 1978 by long-standing Hollywood Foreign Press Association member, Maureen Dragone, the Youth in Film Association was the first organization to establish an awards ceremony specifically set to recognize and award the contributions of performers under the age of 18 in the fields of film, television, theater and music.

== Categories ==
★ Bold indicates the winner in each category.

== Best Young Superstar in Motion Pictures ==
=== Best Young Male Superstar in Motion Pictures ===
★ Corey Haim - The Lost Boys (Warner Bros)

- River Phoenix - The Mosquito Coast (Warner Bros)
- Wil Wheaton - Stand By Me (Columbia Pictures)

=== Best Young Female Superstar in Motion Pictures ===
★ Lisa Bonet - Angel Heart (Tri-Star Pictures)

- Martha Plimpton - The Mosquito Coast (Warner Bros)
- Kristy Swanson - Deadly Friend (Warner Bros)

== Best Young Performer in a Motion Picture ==
=== Best Young Actor in a Motion Picture: Drama ===
★ Fred Savage - The Princess Bride (20th Century Fox)

- Harley Cross - The Believers (Orion Pictures)
- Joshua Miller - River's Edge (Hemdale\Island Pictures)
- Jacob Vargas - The Principal (Tri-Star Pictures)
- Joshua Zuehlke - Amazing Grace and Chuck (Tri-Star Pictures)

=== Best Young Actress in a Motion Picture: Drama ===
★ Lea Thompson - Some Kind of Wonderful (Paramount)

- J. L. Reate - The Golden Child (Paramount)
- Ione Skye - River's Edge (Hemdale/Island Pictures)

=== Best Young Actor in a Motion Picture: Comedy ===
★ Patrick Dempsey - Can't Buy Me Love (Touchstone)

- Ricky Busker - Big Shots (Lorimar/20th Century Fox)
- Keith Coogan - Adventures in Babysitting (Buena Vista/Touchstone)
- Darius McCrary - Big Shots (Lorimar/20th Century Fox)
- Joshua Rudoy - Harry and the Hendersons (Universal)

=== Best Young Actress in a Motion Picture: Comedy ===
★ Maia Brewton - Adventures in Babysitting (Buena Vista/Touchstone)

- Tina Caspary - Can't Buy Me Love (Touchstone)
- Margaret Langrick - Harry and the Hendersons (Universal)
- Amanda Peterson - Can't Buy Me Love (Touchstone)

=== Best Young Actor in a Motion Picture: Horror ===
★ Corey Feldman - The Lost Boys (Warner Bros)

- Stephen Dorff - The Gate (Alliance Entertainment)
- Michael Sharrett - Deadly Friend (Warner Bros)

=== Best Young Actress in a Motion Picture: Horror ===
★ Christa Denton - The Gate (Alliance Entertainment)

- Carrie Lorraine - Dolls (Empire Pictures)
- Jill Schoelen - The Stepfather (New Century Vista Film Company)

== Best Young Superstar in Television ==
=== Best Young Male Superstar in Television ===
★ Kirk Cameron - Growing Pains (ABC)

- Chad Allen - Our House (NBC)
- Jason Bateman - Valerie (NBC)
- Brice Beckham - Mr. Belvedere (ABC)
- Malcolm-Jamal Warner - The Cosby Show (NBC)

=== Best Young Female Superstar in Television ===
★ Alyssa Milano - Who's the Boss? (ABC)

- Drew Barrymore - Babes in Toyland (NBC)
- Tonya Crowe - Knots Landing (CBS)
- Soleil Moon Frye - Punky Brewster (NBC)
- Tracy Wells - Mr. Belvedere (ABC)

== Best Young Performer in a TV Special, TV Movie or Variety Show ==
=== Best Young Actor Starring in a Television Drama Special, Movie of the Week or Variety Show ===
★ Bobby Jacoby - A Different Affair (CBS)

- Miguel Alamo - Daniel and the Towers (WonderWorks/PBS)
- David Faustino - A Drug Knot (CBS)
- Huckleberry Fox - A Winner Never Quits (ABC)
- Frederick Koehler - Tender Places (FOX TV)
- Danny Nucci - An Enemy Among Us (CBS)
- Kimber Shoop - The Ted Kennedy Jr. Story (NBC)
- Carl Steven - The Kid Who Wouldn't Quit: The Brad Silverman Story (ABC)

=== Best Young Actress Starring in a Television Drama Special, Movie of the Week or Variety Show ===
★ Jaclyn Bernstein - A Fight For Jenny (NBC)

- Alyson Croft - Double Switch (Disney)
- Ami Foster - Circus of the Stars (CBS)
- Christina Marie Hutter - Circle of Violence: A Family Drama (CBS)
- Tammy Lauren - An Enemy Among Us (CBS)
- Marcie Leeds - When the Bough Breaks (NBC)
- Lindsay Parker - Infidelity (ABC)

== Best Young Performer in a Television Drama Series ==
=== Best Young Actor Starring in a Television Drama Series ===
★ Trey Ames - A Year in the Life (NBC)

- C.B. Barnes - Starman (ABC)
- Shaun Donahue - General Hospital (ABC)
- Brian Austin Green - Knots Landing (CBS)
- Joshua Harris - Dallas (CBS)
- Omri Katz - Dallas (CBS)
- Jamie McEnnan - General Hospital (ABC)
- Bumper Robinson - Days of Our Lives (NBC)
- Paul Stout - Scarecrow and Mrs. King (CBS)
- Tony La Torre - Cagney & Lacey (CBS)
- Wil Wheaton - Star Trek: The Next Generation (KCOP)

=== Best Young Actress Starring in a Television Drama Series ===
★ Amanda Peterson - A Year in the Life (NBC)

- Melissa Brennan - Days of Our Lives (NBC)
- Christie Clark - Days of Our Lives (NBC)
- Alyson Croft - Dallas (CBS)
- Shannen Doherty - Our House (NBC)
- Ami Dolenz - General Hospital (ABC)
- Keri Houlihan - Our House (NBC)
- Kimberly McCullough - General Hospital (ABC)
- Amy Lynn - The Young and the Restless (CBS)

=== Best Young Actor Guest Starring in a Television Drama Series ===
★ Billy Jacoby - 21 Jump Street (episode "America, What a Town") (FOX TV)

- Ryan Bollman - Highway to Heaven (episode "For the Love of Harry") (NBC)
- David Hoskins - The Judge (KHJ TV)
- Chris Hebert - Murder, She Wrote (episode "Color Me Dead") (CBS)
- Damon Hines - L.A. Law (episode "The Grace of Wrath") (NBC)
- Taliesin Jaffe - Amazing Stories (episode "Magic Saturday") (NBC)
- Coleby Lombardo - The Colbys (ABC)
- Paul W. Parker - Highway to Heaven (episode "A Special Love") (NBC)

=== Best Young Actress Guest Starring in a Television Drama Series ===
★ Alyson Croft - Cagney & Lacey (CBS)

- Tanya Fenmore - Fame (KTLA)
- Holly Fields - Hard Copy (episode "The Trouble with Kids Today") (CBS)
- Heather Haase - The Twilight Zone (episode "Time and Teresa Golowitz") (CBS)
- Elisabeth Harnois - Highway to Heaven (episode "Man's Best Friend") (NBC)
- Kellie Parker - Highway to Heaven (episode "That's Our Dad") (NBC)
- Tori Spelling - Hotel (ABC)

== Best Young Performer in a Television Comedy Series ==
=== Exceptional Performance by a Young Actor in a Television Comedy Series ===
★ Jeremy Miller - Growing Pains (ABC)

- Brandon Call - The Charmings (ABC)
- Scott Grimes - Nothing Is Easy (CBS)
- Andre Gower - Mr. President (FOX TV)
- Jeremy Licht - Valerie (NBC)
- Danny Pintauro - Who's the Boss? (ABC)
- Danny Ponce - Valerie (NBC)
- Jerry Supiran - Small Wonder (FOX TV)
- Jacob Vargas - The Tracey Ullman Show (episode "Viva Taco") (FOX TV)

=== Exceptional Performance by a Young Actress in a Television Comedy Series ===
★ Nicole Eggert - Charles in Charge (KTLA)

- Julie Akin - The Real Adventures of Sherlock Jones and Proctor Watson (PBS)
- Leslie Bega - Head of the Class (ABC)
- Ami Foster - Punky Brewster (NBC)
- Blanca De Garr - Rags to Riches (NBC)
- Khrystyne Haje - Head of the Class (ABC)
- Christina Nigra - Out of This World (NBC)
- Emily Schulman - Small Wonder (FOX TV)
- Tannis Vallely - Head of the Class (ABC)

=== Best Young Actor Starring in a New Television Comedy Series ===
★ Jonathan Ward - The New Adventures of Beans Baxter (FOX TV)

- David Faustino - Married... with Children (FOX TV)
- Kadeem Hardison - A Different World (NBC)
- Jason Horst - I Married Dora (ABC)
- Carl Steven - Out of This World (NBC)

=== Best Young Actress Starring in a New Television Comedy Series ===
★ Staci Love Keanan - My Two Dads (NBC)

- Christina Applegate - Married... with Children (FOX TV)
- Lisa Bonet - A Different World (NBC)
- Maureen Flannigan - Out of This World (NBC)
- Juliette Lewis - I Married Dora (ABC)

=== Best Young Actor Guest-Starring in a Television Comedy Series ===
★ Bobby Jacoby - Perfect Strangers (episode "Ten Speed and a Soft Touch) (ABC)

- Ryan Bollman - Webster (episode "Honor Thy Grandfather") (ABC)
- Phillip Gordon - ALF (episode "Border Song") (NBC)
- Hakeem Abdul-Samad - Amen (episode "Betting on the Boy") (NBC)
- Jadrien Steele - Valerie (episode "Leave it To Willie") (NBC)
- David Wagner - The New Gidget (episode "Jake's Shakes) (KTLA)

=== Best Young Actress Guest-Starring in a Television Comedy Series ===
★ Laura Jacoby - Valerie (NBC)

- Tiffany Ashley - Small Wonder (episode "Woodward and Bernstein") (FOX TV)
- Candace Cameron - Growing Pains (episode "The Long Goodbye") (ABC)
- Tanya Fenmore - The Tracey Ullman Show (FOX TV)
- Rainbow Phoenix - Family Ties (episode "Band on the Run") (NBC)

== Best Young Performer in a Cable Series or Special ==
=== Best Young Actor in a Cable Series or Special ===
★ Scott Nemes - It's Garry Shandling's Show (Showtime)

- Christopher Crabb - Danger Bay (episode "Roots & Wings") (Disney)
- Kipp Marcus - The New Leave It to Beaver (WTBS)
- Georg Olden - Rocky Road (WTBS)
- Eric Osmond - The New Leave It to Beaver (WTBS)
- John Snee - The New Leave It to Beaver (WTBS)

=== Best Young Actress in a Cable Series or Special ===
★ Kaleena Kiff - The New Leave It to Beaver (WTBS)

- Alyson Croft - The Chicago Seven (HBO)
- Jenny Lewis - Uncle Tom's Cabin (Showtime)
- Devon Odessa - Rocky Road (WTBS)
- Alitzah Wiener - Sanchez of Bel Air (USA Network)

== Best Young Performer Under 10 Years of Age ==
=== Best Young Actor Under 10 Years of Age in Television or Motion Picture ===
★ Brian Bonsall - Family Ties (NBC)

- Scott Bremmer - The New Adventures of Beans Baxter (Fox TV)
- Benji Gregory - ALF (NBC)
- Scott Sherk - Our Family Honor (ABC)
- Billy Sullivan - Light of Day (Tri-Star Pictures)

=== Best Young Actress Under 10 Years of Age in Television or Motion Picture ===
★ Heidi Zeigler - Rags to Riches (NBC)

- Natasha Bobo - Nothing is Easy (ABC)
- Olivia Burnette - Celebration Family (ABC)
- Jennifer Roach - Superior Court (KHJ)
- Jodie Sweetin - Full House (ABC)
- Amy Wheaton - The Curse (Trans World Entertainment)

== Best Young Ensemble Performance ==
=== Outstanding Young Actors/Actresses Ensemble in Television or Motion Picture ===
★ The Monster Squad (Tri-Star Pictures) (Motion Picture) - Andre Gower, Robby Kiger, Ryan Lambert, Michael Faustino, Brent Chalem and Ashley Bank

- Bustin' Loose (KTLA) (Television Comedy Series) - Aaron Lohr, Larry Williams, Tyren Perry and Marie Lynn Wise
- Little Spies (Disney) (Television Special) - Jason Hervey, Adam Carl, Peter Smith, Scott Nemes, Candace Cameron and Sarah Jo Martin

=== Outstanding Young Actor/Actress/Ensemble in Animation Voice-Over ===
★ An American Tail (Universal) - Phillip Glasser and Amy Green

- The Berenstain Bears (Hanna-Barbera/Southern Star Productions) - Christina Lange, David Mendenhall and Josh Rodine
- Dennis the Menace (DIC Enterprises) - Brennan Thicke
- Foofur (Hanna Barbera) - [Christina Lange
- The New Adventures of Jonny Quest (Hannah Barbera) - Scott Menville and Georgi Irene
- Moon Dreamers (Marvel Productions/Hasbro/Sunbow Productions) - Elizabeth Lyn Fraser, Melanie Gaffin and Robin Kaufman
- My Little Pony (Marvel Productions/Hasbro/Sunbow Productions) - Bettina and Keri Houlihan
- Potato Head Kids (Marvel Productions/Hasbro/Sunbow Productions) - Ian Fried, Susie Garbo, Scott Grimes, Christina Lange, Scott Menville, Kellie Martin, Anne Marie McEvoy, David Mendenhall, Breckin Meyer and Laura Mooney
- Pound Puppies (Hanna Barbera) - Ami Foster
- It's Punky Brewster (Ruby-Spears) - Casey Ellison, Teddy S. Field III, Ami Foster, Soleil Moon Frye and Cherie Johnson
- Wildfire (Hanna Barbera) - Georgi Irene, Bobby Jacoby and Lilly Moon

== Best Family Television Entertainment ==
=== Best Television Family Special, Movie of the Week or Variety Show ===
★ A Fight for Jenny (NBC)

- A Desperate Exit (ABC)
- A Different Affair (CBS)
- An Enemy Among Us (CBS)
- Circle of Violence: A Family Drama (CBS)
- Circus of the Stars (CBS)
- Little Spies (Disney)
- Stranger in My Bed (NBC)
- Tender Places (FOX TV)
- Daniel and the Towers (Wonderworks PBS)

=== Best Family Television Drama Series ===
★ Our House (NBC)

- Highway to Heaven (NBC)
- Starman (ABC)

=== Best Family Comedy Series ===
★ Growing Pains (ABC)

- Alf (NBC)
- The Cosby Show (NBC)
- Family Ties (NBC)
- Head of the Class (ABC)
- Mr. Belvedere (ABC)
- Rags to Riches (NBC)
- Valerie (NBC)
- Who's the Boss? (ABC)

=== The Most Promising New Fall Television Series ===
★ My Two Dads (NBC)

- A Different World (NBC)
- A Year in the Life (NBC)
- Bustin' Loose (KTLA)
- Degrassi Junior High (PBS)
- Full House (ABC)
- Married... with Children (FOX TV)
- The New Adventures of Beans Baxter (FOX TV)
- Out of This World (NBC)

=== Best Cable Series ===
★ The New Leave It to Beaver (WTBS)

- The Chicago Seven (HBO)
- It's Garry Shandling's Show (Showtime)
- Rocky Road (WTBS)
- Sanchez of Bel Air (USA)
- Uncle Tom's Cabin (Showtime)

=== Best Animation Series or Special for Family Viewing ===
★ The Flintstone Kids (Hanna Barbera)

- Cathy (Lee Mendelson/Bill Melendez Productions)
- Foofur (Hanna Barbera)
- Ghostbusters (Filmation)
- Moon Dreamers (Marvel)
- My Little Pony (Marvel)

== Best Family Motion Picture Entertainment ==
=== Best Family Motion Picture: Animation ===
★ An American Tail (Universal/Amblin Entertainment)

- The Care Bears Adventure in Wonderland (Nelvana Productions)
- The Chipmunk Adventure (Bagdasaran Productions)

=== Best Family Motion Picture: Comedy ===
★ Like Father, Like Son (Tri-Star)

- Adventures in Babysitting (Touchstone Pictures)
- Big Shots (Lorimar/20th Century Fox)
- Can't Buy Me Love (Touchstone Pictures)
- Harry and the Hendersons (Universal)
- Raising Arizona (20th Century Fox)

=== Best Family Motion Picture: Drama ===
★ Over the Top (Cannon Films)

- Amazing Grace and Chuck (Tri-Star)
- Benji the Hunted (Disney)
- Nutcracker: The Motion Picture (Atlantic Entertainment)
- Solarbabies (MGM)
- Star Trek IV: The Voyage Home (Paramount Pictures)

=== Teen-age Favorite Horror/Drama Motion Picture ===
★ The Lost Boys (Warner Bros.)

- Deadly Friend (Warner Bros.)
- Near Dark (DeLaurentis Entertainment Group)
- River's Edge (Hemdale)
- The Stepfather (New Century/Vista Film Company)
- Summer Camp Nightmare (Concorde Pictures)

== Youth In Film's Special Awards ==
=== Best Family Music Video ===
★ Lionel Richie's "Ballerina Girl"

=== The Jackie Coogan Award ===
==== Outstanding Contribution to Youth Through Entertainment ====
★ Chuck Berry

=== Former Child Stars Life Achievement Awards ===
★ Tony Dow and Ken Osmond of the Old and New Leave It to Beaver series

=== Best Young Actor in A Foreign Film ===
★ Anton Glanzelius - My Life as a Dog (Sweden)

=== Best Young Actress in A Foreign Film ===
★ Melinda Kinnaman - My Life as a Dog (Sweden)

=== Best Family Foreign Film ===
★ My Life as a Dog (Sweden) - Directed by Lasse Hallström
