= Hambone and Hillie =

- Theatrical release poster
- Directed by: Roy Watts
- Written by: Sandra K. Bailey; Michael Murphey; Joel Soisson
- Story by: Ken Barnett
- Produced by: Don Levin; Mel Pearl
- Starring: Lillian Gish; Candy Clark; O. J. Simpson; Robert Walker Jr.; Jack Carter; Alan Hale Jr.; Anne Lockhart; Timothy Bottoms; Sidney Robin Greenbush; William Jordan; Paul Koslo; Arnie Moore; Nancy Morgan
- Cinematography: Jon R. Kranhouse
- Edited by: R.J. Kizer
- Music by: George Garvarentz
- Production companies: Adams Apple Film Company; CinAmerica; VTC
- Distributed by: New World Pictures
- Release date: April 24, 1984
- Running time: 90 minutes
- Country: United States
- Language: English

Hambone and Hillie is a 1984 American comedy-drama film about a dog (Hambone) separated from his owner (Hillie). The dog treks from New York to Los Angeles, meeting a host of helpers along the way. It was directed by Roy Watts, and starred Lillian Gish, Timothy Bottoms, Candy Clark, and O. J. Simpson.

== Plot ==
A dog treks a long, arduous journey from New York City to Los Angeles to be reunited with his owner, Hillie, meeting a lot of helpers along the way.

== Cast ==
- Lillian Gish as Hillie Radcliffe
- Candy Clark as Nancy Rollins
- O. J. Simpson as Tucker
- Robert Walker Jr. as The Wanderer
- Jack Carter as Lester Burns
- Alan Hale Jr. as McVickers
- Anne Lockhart as Roberta Radcliffe
- Timothy Bottoms as Michael Radcliffe
- Sidney Robin Greenbush as Amy McVickers
- William Jordan as Bert Rollins
- Paul Koslo as Jere
- Arnie Moore as Dognapper
- Nancy Morgan as Ellen
- Robert Feero as Skip
- Alan Abelew as Manny
- Maureen Quinn as Edna Reilly
- Vincent Doherty as Baggage Handler
- Hap Lawrence as L.A. TWA Clerk
- Marc Bentley as Danny
- Nicole Eggert as Marci
- Virginya Keehne as Shelly
- Gregory Brown as Pat
- Bill Berry as Chicago Sheriff
- Jennifer George as Kathy Radcliffe
- Wil Wheaton as Jeff Radcliffe
- Lillian Adams as Estelle
- David Wiley as Dr. Simpkins
- Tom Preston as Highway Patrol Officer
- Robert Michaels as Mover
- Hambone as Hambone The Dog
- Patches as Camille
- Mike as Scrapper
- Ellie as Barney

== Production ==
=== Filming ===
Hambone and Hillie was filmed in July and August 1983 in New York City; Pittsburgh; Chicago; Springfield, Illinois; St Louis; Marion, Kansas; Colorado Springs; Las Vegas; and Los Angeles.

=== Casting ===
Lillian Gish was cast as Hillie Radcliffe.

== Release ==
Hambone and Hillie was released in theatres on April 24, 1984. The film was released on VHS on October 6, 1997, by Anchor Bay Entertainment.
