= 4th Youth in Film Awards =

1982 US media awards ceremony

- Official program
- Awarded for: Achievement in the 1981—1982 season
- Date: November 21, 1982
- Site: Sheraton Universal Hotel; Universal City, California
- Hosted by: David Faustino

The 4th Youth in Film Awards ceremony (now known as the Young Artist Awards), presented by the Youth in Film Association, honored outstanding youth performers under the age of 21 in the fields of film and television for the 1981-1982 season, and took place on November 21, 1982, at the Sheraton Universal Hotel in Universal City, California.

The big winner that year was E.T. the Extra-Terrestrial, with one of the rare "sweeps" in the history of the Youth in Film Awards. The film won all categories for which it was nominated, taking a total of four awards – "Best 'Fantasy' Family Motion Picture", "Best Young Actor in a Motion Picture" for Henry Thomas, "Best Young Supporting Actor in a Motion Picture" for Robert MacNaughton and "Best Young Supporting Actress in a Motion Picture" for Drew Barrymore.

Established in 1978 by long-standing Hollywood Foreign Press Association member, Maureen Dragone, the Youth in Film Association was the first organization to establish an awards ceremony specifically set to recognize and award the contributions of performers under the age of 18 in the fields of film, television, theater and music.

== Categories ==
★ Bold indicates the winner in each category.

== Best Young Performer in a Feature Film ==
=== Best Young Motion Picture Actor ===
★ Henry Thomas - E.T. the Extra-Terrestrial (Universal) as as Elliott

- Doug McKeon - Night Crossing (Disney) as Frank Strelzyk
- Matt Dillon - Tex (Disney) as Texas "Tex" McCormick

=== Best Young Motion Picture Actress ===
★ Aileen Quinn - Annie (Columbia) as Annie

- Bridgette Andersen - Savannah Smiles (Embassy) as Savannah Smiles
- Michelle Pfeiffer - Grease 2 (Paramount) as Stephanie Zinone

=== Best Young Supporting Actor in a Motion Picture ===
★ Robert MacNaughton - E.T. the Extra-Terrestrial (Universal) as Michael Taylor

- Ian Fried - Rocky III (MGM) as Robert "Rocky" Balboa Jr.
- Josh Milrad - The Beastmaster (Film Builder's Corp) as Tal
- Ronnie Scribner - Split Image (Orion) as Sean Stetson
- Sam Robards - Tempest (Columbia) as Freddy

=== Best Young Supporting Actress in a Motion Picture ===
★ Drew Barrymore - E.T. the Extra-Terrestrial (Universal) as Gertie

- Toni Ann Gisondi - Annie (Columbia) as Molly
- Heather O'Rourke - Poltergeist (MGM) as Carol Anne Freeling
- Molly Ringwald - Tempest (Columbia) as Miranda Dimitrius

== Best Young Performer in a Television Movie ==
=== Best Young Actor in a Movie Made for Television ===
★ Neil Billingsley - Million Dollar Infield (CBS) as Jay Frische

- David Faustino - 40 Days for Danny (ABC) as Danny
- Lance Kerwin - The Shooting (CBS) as Billy Lee Daniels
- Meeno Peluce - Million Dollar Infield (CBS) as Joshua Miller
- Ricky Schroder - Little Lord Fauntelroy (Norman Rosemont Productions) as Cedric Errol

=== Best Young Actress in a Movie Made for Television ===
★ Nancy McKeon - The Facts of Life Goes to Paris (NBC) as Jo Polniaczek

- Susan Blackstone - The Rules of Marriage (20th Century Fox) as Margo Hagan
- Tara Kennedy - The Electric Grandmother (NBC) as Agatha
- Angela Lee - Breaking Up is Hard To Do (Columbia)
- Sydney Penny - The Patricia Neal Story (CBS) as Tessa Dahl
- Sydney Penny - The Capture of Grizzly Adams (NBC) as Peg Adams

== Best Young Performer in a Television Special ==
=== Best Young Actor in a Television Special ===
★ Adam Rich - CBS Children's Mystery Theatre - Zertigo Diamond Caper (CBS) as Jeffrey Brenner

- Scott Constantine - Sam (Associated Film Artists)
- Jason Hervey - ABC Afterschool Special - Daddy, I'm Their Mama Now (ABC) as Roy Rollins
- Jason Lively - ABC Afterschool Special - Daddy, I'm Their Mama Now (ABC) as Johnny Rollins
- Barret Oliver - The Circle Family (NBC) as Q.P. Circle
- Byron Thames - CBS Afternoon Playhouse - Just Pals (CBS) as Danny Gordon

=== Best Young Actress in a Television Special ===
★ Nancy McKeon - Please Don't Hit Me, Mom! (ABC) as Nancy Parks

- Heather Haase - Goldie and Kids: Listen to Us (ABC) as Self
- Heather McAdam - CBS Afternoon Playhouse Just Pals (CBS) as Jo Davis
- Sydney Penny - The Circle Family (NBC)

== Best Young Performer in a Television Series ==
=== Best Young Actor in a Drama Series ===
★ Timothy Gibbs - Father Murphy (NBC) as Will Adams

- David Friedman - Little House on the Prairie: A New Beginning (NBC) as Jason Carter
- Matthew Laborteaux - Little House on the Prairie: A New Beginning (NBC) as Albert Quinn Ingalls
- Scott Mellini - Father Murphy (NBC) as Ephram Winkler
- Adam Rich - Code Red (ABC) as Danny Blake

=== Best Young Actress in a Drama Series ===
★ (tie) Melissa Gilbert - Little House on the Prairie: A New Beginning (NBC) as Laura Ingalls Wilder
★ (tie) Jill Whelan - The Love Boat (ABC) as Vicki Stubing

- Allison Balson - Little House on the Prairie: A New Beginning (NBC) as Nancy Oleson
- Tonya Crowe - Knots Landing (CBS) as Olivia Cunningham Dyer
- Shannen Doherty - Little House on the Prairie: A New Beginning (NBC) as Jenny Wilder
- Missy Francis - Little House on the Prairie: A New Beginning (NBC) as Cassandra Cooper Ingalls

=== Best Young Actor in a Comedy Series ===
★ Gary Coleman - Diff'rent Strokes (NBC) as Arnold Jackson

- Peter Billingsley - Real People (NBC) as Self - Host
- Todd Bridges - Diff'rent Strokes (NBC) as Willis Jackson
- Glenn Scarpelli - One Day at a Time (CBS) as Alex Handris

=== Best Young Actress in a Comedy Series ===
★ Nancy McKeon - The Facts of Life (NBC) as Jo Polniaczek

- Danielle Brisebois - Archie Bunker's Place (CBS) as Stephanie Mills
- Mindy Cohn - The Facts of Life (NBC) as Natalie Green
- Missy Gold - Benson (ABC) as Katie Gatling
- Kaleena Kiff - Love, Sidney (NBC) as Patricia “Patti” Morgan
- Kari Michaelsen - Gimme a Break! (NBC) as Kathleen "Katie" Kanisky
- Heather O'Rourke - Happy Days (ABC) as Heather Pfister
- Lisa Whelchel - The Facts of Life (NBC) as Blair Warner

=== Best Young Actor in a New Television Series ===
★ Ricky Schroder - Silver Spoons (NBC) as Richard Bluthorn "Rick" or "Ricky" Stratton

- Scott Baio - Joanie Loves Chachi (ABC) as Chachi Arcola
- Jason Bateman - Silver Spoons (NBC) as Derek Taylor
- Christian Jacobs - Gloria (CBS) as Joey Stivic
- Meeno Peluce - Voyagers! (NBC) as Jeffrey Jones
- River Phoenix - Seven Brides for Seven Brothers (CBS)as Guthrie McFadden

=== Best Young Actress in a New Television Series ===
★ Erin Moran - Joanie Loves Chachi (ABC) as Joanie Cunningham

- Amy Linker - Square Pegs (CBS) as Lauren Hutchinson
- Kathy Maisnik - Star of the Family (ABCd) as Jennie Lee Krebs
- Sarah Jessica Parker - Square Pegs (CBS) as Patty Greene
- Tina Yothers - Family Ties (NBC) as Jennifer Keaton

=== Best Young Actor in a Daytime Series ===
★ Michael Damian - The Young and the Restless (CBS) as Danny Romalotti

- Dick Billingsley - Days of Our Lives (NBC) as Scotty Banning
- Andre Gower - The Young and the Restless (CBS) as Brooks Prentiss
- David Mendenhall - General Hospital (ABC) as Mike Webber
- Damion Scheller - Texas (NBC) as Gregory Linden Marshall
- John Stamos - General Hospital (ABC) as Blackie Parrish

=== Best Young Actress in a Daytime Series ===
★Janine Turner - General Hospital (ABC) as Laura Templeton

- Jennifer Cooke - Guiding Light (CBS) as Morgan Richards Nelson
- Liz Keifer - The Young and the Restless (CBS) as Angela Lawrence
- Debbie Lytton - Days of Our Lives (NBC) as Melissa Horton
- Lori Loughlin - The Edge of Night (ABC) as Jody Travis

=== Best Young Actor: Guest on a Series ===
★ Keith Mitchell - Knight Rider (NBC) as Davey Benson

- Marc Bentley - The Young and the Restless (CBS) as Chucky Roulland
- Kirk Brennan - Father Murphy (NBC) as Boy #1
- Corey Feldman - The Love Boat (ABC) as Mike Lee
- Rossie Harris - Hart to Hart (ABC) as Jess
- Chez Lister - Father Murphy (NBC) as Eli
- Shavar Ross - Diff'rent Strokes (NBC) as Dudley Johnson
- Lance Toyoshima - M*A*S*H (CBS) as Kim Han

=== Best Young Actress: Guest on a Series ===
★ Roxana Zal - Hart to Hart (ABC) as Riley

- Shannen Doherty - Father Murphy (NBC) as Drusilla Shannon
- Nicole Eggert - Fantasy Island (ABC) as Amy Watkins
- Angela Lee - Quincy, M.E. (NBC) as Jenny Silver
- Sheri Strahl - Little House on the Prairie: A Christmas To Remember (NBC) as Young Caroline

== Best Family Entertainment ==
=== Best Family Motion Picture ===
★ Rocky III (M.G.M.)

- Night Crossing (Disney)
- Tex (Disney)
- Savannah Smiles (Embassy)

=== Best Family Motion Picture: Animated, Music or Fantasy ===
★ E.T. the Extra-Terrestrial (Universal)

- Annie (Columbia)
- Grease 2 (Paramount)
- The Secret of NIMH (M.G.M.)
- Tron (Disney)

=== Best New Family Television Series ===
★ Silver Spoons (NBC)

- Knight Rider (NBC)
- Little House on the Prairie, A New Beginning (NBC)
- Seven Brides for Seven Brothers (CBS)
- Star of the Family (ABC)
