= Patrick Cauvin =

French writer (1932–2010)

- Born: Claude Klotz; 6 October 1932; Marseille, France
- Died: 13 August 2010 (aged 77); Paris, France
- Citizenship: France
- Occupations: Author, screenwriter
- Writing career
- Language: French
- Genres: Young adult literature, romance, crime, screenwriting
- Notable work: E = mc² Mon Amour

Claude Klotz (6 October 1932 – 13 August 2010), better known by his pen name Patrick Cauvin, was a French teacher turned writer. He was born in Marseille and died in Paris.

His novel E=mc² Mon Amour was adapted into the Oscar winning 1979 film A Little Romance.

Cauvin wrote a sequel to the novel E=mc² Mon Amour entitled Pythagore, je t'adore that was released in 2001.

== Works ==
All works published by Le Livre de Poche except when noted otherwise.

- 1971: Les Innommables ("The Unspeakables"), as Claude Klotz
- 1977: E=mc² Mon Amour ("E=mc² My Love")
- 1982: Nous allions vers les beaux jours ("We went to the beautiful days")
- 1982: Monsieur papa ("Mister Daddy")
- 1982: L'amour aveugle ("Blind love")
- 1983: Pourquoi pas nous ? ("Why not us?")
- 1983: Huit jours en été ("Eight days in summer")
- 1984: C'était le Pérou ("It was Peru")
- 1985: Dans les bras du vent ("In the arms of the wind")
- 1986: Laura Brams
- 1987: C'était le pérou Tome II ("It was Peru volume II")
- 1987: Haute-Pierre
- 1988: Povchéri
- 1990: Werther, ce soir... ("Werther, this evening...")
- 1992: Rue des bons-enfants ("Street of the good children")
- 1992: Kobar, Éditions Albin Michel
- 1993: Belles galères ("Beautiful galleys")
- 1995: Menteur ("Liar")
- 1996: Tout ce que Joseph écrivit cette année là ("Everything Joseph wrote that year")
- 1997: Villa Vanille
- 1999: Théâtre dans la nuit ("Theatre in the night")
- 1998: Présidente ("President")
- 2001: Pythagore, je t'adore ("Pythagoras, I love you"), Éditions Albin Michel
- 2002: Torrentera
- 2004: Le sang des roses ("The blood of roses")
- 2004: Le silence de Clara ("The silence of Clara"), Éditions Albin Michel
- 2005: Jardin fatal ("Fatal garden")
- 2005: La reine du monde ("The queen of the world")
- 2007: Belange
- 2007: Venge-moi! ("Avenge me!")
- 2008: Les pantoufles du samouraï ("The slippers of the Samurai")
- 2008: La maison de l'été ("The house of summer"), NiL Éditions
- 2009: Déclic ("Click"), Plon
- 2010: Une seconde chance ("A second chance"), Plon
