= Three Men and a Little Lady =

1990 film by Emile Ardolino

- Theatrical release poster
- Directed by: Emile Ardolino
- Screenplay by: Charlie Peters
- Based on: Trois hommes et un couffin by Coline Serreau
- Produced by: Ted Field; Robert W. Cort
- Starring: Tom Selleck; Steve Guttenberg; Ted Danson; Nancy Travis; Christopher Cazenove; Fiona Shaw; Sheila Hancock
- Cinematography: Adam Greenberg
- Edited by: Michael A. Stevenson
- Music by: James Newton Howard
- Production companies: Touchstone Pictures; Interscope Communications
- Distributed by: Buena Vista Pictures Distribution
- Release date: November 21, 1990
- Running time: 104 minutes
- Country: United States
- Language: English
- Budget: $20-25 million
- Box office: $71.6 million

Three Men and a Little Lady is a 1990 American comedy film directed by Emile Ardolino. It is the sequel to the 1987 film Three Men and a Baby. Tom Selleck, Steve Guttenberg, and Ted Danson reprise the leading roles.

Three Men and a Little Lady was released by Buena Vista Pictures Distribution on November 21, 1990. In its opening weekend, the film was screened at 1,281 theaters, earning $19.1 million and finishing in 2nd place in the box office behind Home Alone.

== Plot ==
Peter Mitchell, Michael Kellam, and Jack Holden are living happily together with Mary Bennington, who is now five, and her mother, Sylvia. They relocate from their apartment loft to a bigger house in the city. Peter and Michael continue as an architect and cartoonist, while Jack has little acting work. Sylvia has become a famous actress and is dating director Edward Hargreave who wishes to marry her, but Sylvia is unsure how it will affect Mary.

Sylvia and Peter are clearly in love with each other, although he won't admit his true feelings. When visiting, Sylvia's mother Vera warns her that he may never be able to express or admit his feelings. Sylvia realizes she wants to get married and start a family, so Jack intervenes and, knowing they are both Mary's birth parents, asks her to marry him. Sylvia rejects him, stating that he is a good father, but would make a lousy husband. Sylvia accepts Edward's proposal, announcing she and Mary will be moving to the UK after the wedding.

Inviting Edward to the apartment, Peter tests some waters on Edward showing that he doubted Edward would be a good father for Mary. When he leaves, Sylvia confronts Peter, leading to a falling out when she calls him selfish, and he reminds her she abandoned Mary once (as described in the first film). Sylvia slaps Peter for the comment and storms off.

Sylvia and Mary leave the next day for the UK. The men, depressed, try to cheer themselves up with one of their bachelor-style parties, but are still miserable without Mary and Sylvia. Peter and Michael go to the UK to visit Mary, who is unhappy without them, while Jack is filming on location in Brazil. Peter and Michael arrive in time for the rehearsal dinner, happily reuniting with Mary and Sylvia. Miss Elspeth Lomax, headmistress of Pileforth Academy for Girls, is introduced to Peter by Edward (who tells her Peter is secretly interested in her). Peter and Sylvia apologize to each other for the fight.

With the wedding imminent, Peter is concerned as Mary says Edward dislikes her. Peter and Michael realize Edward plans to send Mary to Pileforth. Edward denies it and Sylvia refuses to believe Peter, who has always disliked Edward. Jack arrives mid-argument and Sylvia and Edward leave. Peter admits he loves Sylvia but stayed silent due to Jack and Sylvia's past. Jack insists that Sylvia only loves Peter and he must follow his heart.

The night before the wedding, Peter breaks into Pileforth to get proof of Edward's scheme. Elspeth believes Peter is admitting his "feelings", throwing herself at him. Very surprised and deflecting her advances, he gets away with the evidence in hand. After his car breaks down in the countryside, he calls Jack and Michael and confirms that he has the proof, but he will be late. Michael, Jack, and Mary try to stall the wedding. Michael kidnaps Vicar Hewitt and Jack disguises himself as an elderly replacement. Peter, with help from Elspeth, heads to the wedding. During the ride, she says Edward told her Peter was interested in her, but Peter says Edward lied, apologizing for his deceit. They crashed the car into a creek bed and wind up borrowing a motorcycle from a sheepherder.

After numerous delays, Peter and Elspeth arrive at the chapel. Peter shows Sylvia the truth, but she remains in disbelief until Elspeth confirms that Edward has been lying to her. Sylvia comes to her senses and confronts Edward, who tries to defend his decision. When Mary called him out for his lies, Edward shows his true colors by swearing at Mary, causing Peter to knock him out. Sylvia insists she's going home, but Peter stops her, ultimately declaring his love. Then, Edward regains consciousness, stating it is too late as they are already married. Jack then reveals himself – he has both finally proven his acting skills and rendered the marriage invalid.

Peter and Sylvia wed with Mary as their bridesmaid. Mary throws the bouquet into the air as they leave the chapel, and it is caught by Jack who expressed shock.

== Cast ==
- Tom Selleck as Peter Mitchell, one of the three men, a successful NYC architect
- Steve Guttenberg as Michael Kellam, one of the three men, a cartoonist
- Ted Danson as Jack Holden, one of the three men, an actor and Mary's biological father
- Nancy Travis as Sylvia Bennington, Mary's mother
- Christopher Cazenove as Edward Hargreave, a successful director and the scheming bachelor
- Fiona Shaw as Miss Elspeth Lomax, headmistress of Pileforth Academy for Girls
- Sheila Hancock as Vera Bennington, Sylvia's mother
- Robin Weisman as Mary Bennington, Sylvia's daughter
- John Boswall as Barrow, Edward's butler
- Jonathan Lynn as Vicar Hewitt, the minister for the wedding
- Sydney Walsh as Laurie
- Lynne Marta as Teacher
- Rosalind Allen as Pretty Girl
- Bryan Pringle as Old Englishman
- Ian Redford as Farmer

== Production ==
The movie was filmed on location in New York and the United Kingdom, with the latter primarily consisting of shots in Banbury in north Oxfordshire. Particular use is made of Broughton Castle. The scenes where the car breaks down and Peter Mitchell (Tom Selleck) makes a call from a phone box are shot at Burton Dassett Country Park, in south Warwickshire. The school which Mary Bennington (Robin Weisman) was to attend (Pileforth Academy) was shot at two locations. The external shot of the school is the Jesuit boarding school Stonyhurst College in the Ribble Valley, Lancashire. Some internal scenes of the school, including the panelled and curtained cubicles were also filmed at Stonyhurst. Other internal scenes were shot at the (former) Benedictine boarding school Douai School near Thatcham, West Berkshire.

== Release ==
Three Men and a Little Lady premiered in Los Angeles and New York on November 21, 1990.

=== Box office ===
In its opening weekend, the film was screened at 1,281 theaters, earning $19.1 million and finishing in 2nd place behind Home Alone. By the end of the second week, it had dropped to 3rd place with a total gross of $29.8 million and by the end of the third week was in 5th place with a total gross of $35.9 million.

== Reception ==
On the review aggregator website Rotten Tomatoes, the film holds an approval rating of 40% based on 20 reviews, with an average rating of 4.4/10.

Critics Rita Kempley and Desson Howe of The Washington Post wrote positively of the film, citing the three main characters' comical rap, the race for Peter to stop the wedding, and the relationship between him and Miss Elspeth Lomax (Fiona Shaw) as the film's most enjoyable scenes. However, Howe also criticized it, claiming Ted Danson and Steve Guttenberg were overshadowed for the remainder of the film.

== Soundtrack ==
One of the most widely recognized tracks from the film is "Waiting for a Star to Fall" by Boy Meets Girl, which featured during the final wedding scene and end credits. The film's soundtrack album contains the three leads' singing "Goodnite, Sweetheart, Goodnite" from Three Men and a Baby, which had no soundtrack album of its own.

== Sequel ==
In June 2010, Selleck said that Disney had discussed with him on developing a sequel tentatively titled Three Men and a Bride. While Selleck later stated the third film "seemed to be real, then disappeared" in 2013, a Disney spokesman said that a new Three Men and a Baby entry was in development. A remake of the first film was announced in 2020 for the Disney+ streaming service with Zac Efron set to be in the cast. As of 2023, Mo Marable was still set to direct the remake as his first feature film.
