= Robin Weisman =

American actress

- Born: March 14, 1984 (age 42); Hollywood, Florida, U.S.
- Occupation: Actress
- Years active: 1990–1994
- Spouse: John Kabot (m. 2008; div. 2011)

Robin Weisman (born March 14, 1984) is an American former child actress. She is well known as the "little lady" Mary Bennington in the 1990 film Three Men and a Little Lady co-starring Tom Selleck, Steve Guttenberg and Ted Danson.

== Biography ==
Weisman was born in Hollywood, Florida to parents Betsy and David Weisman and acted between 1990 and 1994. Following Three Men and a Little Lady, she made an appearance on Wogan in 1991. She also appeared in Keys with Marg Helgenberger and Thunder in Paradise with Hulk Hogan. She left Thunder in Paradise after three episodes and was replaced in the role by Ashley Gorrell.

Weisman married her childhood sweetheart John Kabot in a Jewish ceremony on December 20, 2008. They lived in Plantation, Florida, near Weisman's hometown of Fort Lauderdale until their divorce in 2011.
