= Marc Bentley =

American actor (1968–2020)

Marc Bentley (1968 – November 23, 2020) was an American actor who appeared on television during the late 1970s and early 1980s. The epitome of those sun-blonded surf and sun kids of the era, he was a keen skateboarder.

Bentley grew up in Southern California. Heappeared in such shows as The Young and the Restless, Lou Grant, Fantasy Island and CHiPs. He also starred in the TV-Movies Terror Among Us and The Seduction of Miss Leona, as well as the feature films Hambone and Hillie and Valentine.

Bentley was shortlisted in the Young Artist Awards in 1981 (the first year the awards were made) as best young actor in a daytime series for his part as Chucky Roulland in CBS's The Young and the Restless.

== Filmography ==
Year	Title	Role	Notes
1973	The Young and the Restless	Chucky Roulland (1980-1982)	TV series
1979	The Rockford Files	Ethan	Episode: "The Man Who Saw the Alligators"
1979	Fantasy Island	Jamie Dearborn	Episode: "Birthday Party/Ghostbreaker"
1980	The Seduction of Miss Leona	Joey Dawson	TV movie
1981	Terror Among Us	Bill Jr	TV movie
1981	Lou Grant	Jesse	Episode: "Survival"
1981	Separate Ways	Allen Jr.	
1983	Hambone and Hillie	Danny	
1989	Married... with Children	Lewis	Episode: "Oh, What a Feeling", (final appearance)
