= The Earthling =

1980 film by Peter Collinson

- Film Poster
- Directed by: Peter Collinson
- Written by: Lanny Cotler
- Produced by: Samuel Z. Arkoff; Elliot Schick; John Strong
- Starring: William Holden; Ricky Schroder
- Cinematography: Donald McAlpine
- Edited by: Nicholas Beauman
- Music by: Dick DeBenedictis; Bruce Smeaton
- Distributed by: Filmways Pictures
- Release date: 24 July 1980
- Running time: 97 minutes
- Countries: United States; Australia
- Language: English
- Budget: $4.5 million
- Box office: A$72,000 (Australia)

The Earthling is a 1980 American-Australian adventure film directed by Peter Collinson, and starring William Holden and Ricky Schroder. It was filmed in Australia in 1979, and was the last to be directed by Collinson before his death the following year.

The film generated controversy among critics and viewers due to the grim storyline, and was beset with problems and internal friction due to the dark tone of the script, aggressive changes to the script and the treatment of child actor Schroder by Collinson, leading co-star Holden to personally step in to protect the young boy, which led to massive friction between the lead actor and the director.

== Plot ==
Patrick Foley is a jaded loner who has been a drifter for much of his life. Discovering he has terminal cancer, he travels to the Australian outback where he grew up to die in solitude. However, his plans are interrupted after ten year old Shawn Daley's parents die in a horrific accident when their RV plummeted off a cliff, leaving the boy traumatised, alone and helpless. Reluctantly, Foley accompanies Shawn and teaches him how to survive the wilderness. After Foley dies, Shawn begins his trek back to civilisation.

== Cast ==
- William Holden as Patrick Foley
- Ricky Schroder as Shawn Daley
- Olivia Hamnett as Bettina Daley
- Jack Thompson as Ross Daley
- Alwyn Kurts as Christian Neilson
- Pat Evison as Meg Neilson
- Redmond Phillips as Bobby Burns
- Ray Barrett as Parnell
- Tony Barry as Red
- Allan Penney as Harlan
- Willie Fennell as R. C.
- Walter Pym as Uncle
- Fred "Cul" Cullen as Dawson
- Dawn A. Gregg as Dalton
- Maggie Blinco as Jessica
- Tui Bow as Lyla
- Danny Adcock as Bus Driver

== Production ==
The film was shot from September to October 1979 in the Blue Mountains, Barrington Forest and Warrumbungle National Park. It was reported that Holden and Schroder got along while filming. Schroder named one of his children Holden in honour of his co-star.

It was one of several films Jack Thompson made around this time where he supported an American star.

During the filming of The Earthling, Collinson discovered that he had terminal lung cancer and died the following year.

== Reception ==
The film drew greatly mixed reviews, with some critics reviling it, while others praised it. It played to little notice in theatres, but later became something of a daytime staple on HBO and other cable-movie channels in the 1980s. It grossed $72,000 for box office in Australia.

== See also ==
- Cinema of Australia
