= Bruce Allan Clark =

Canadian lawyer

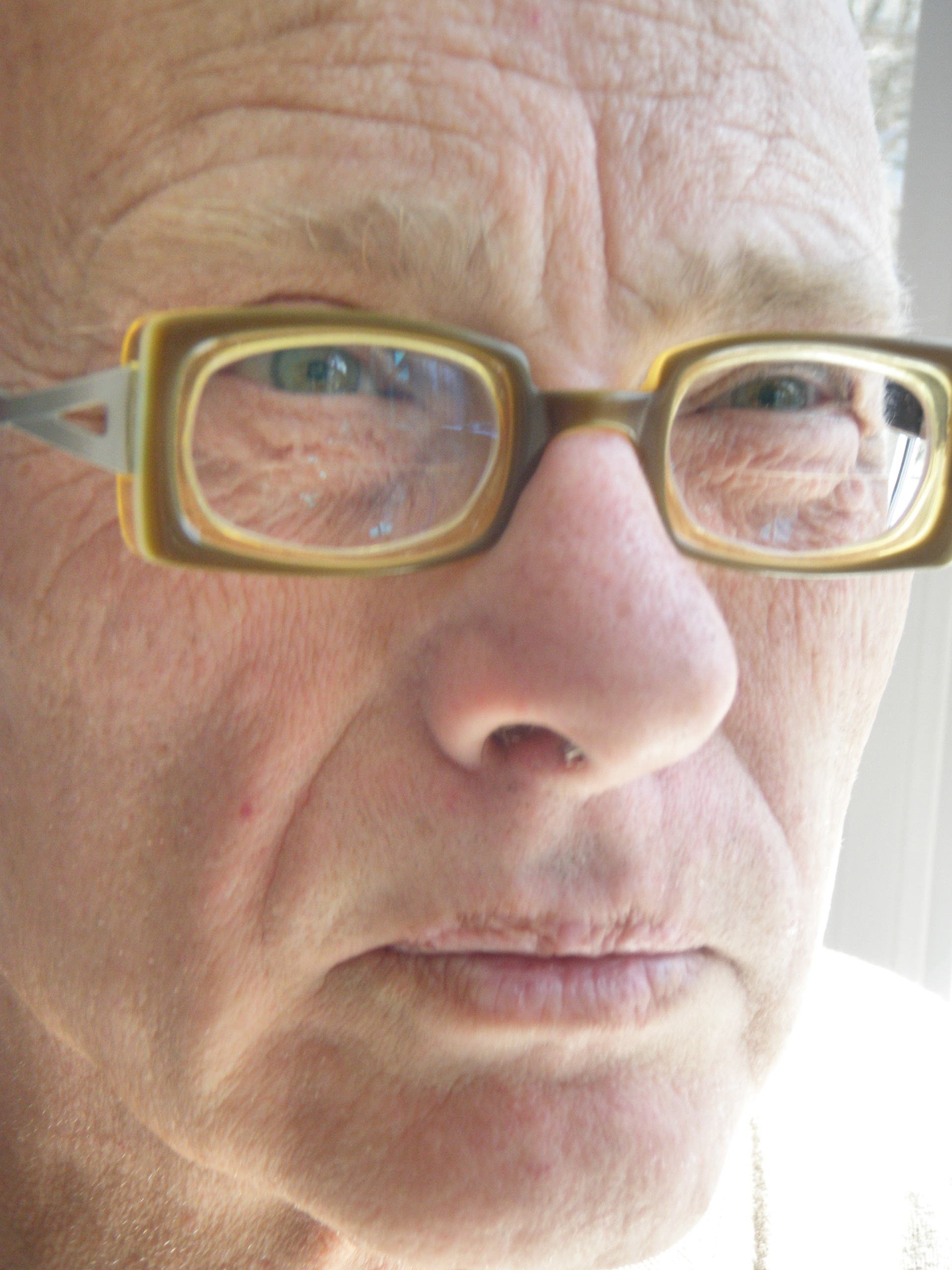
- Clark on April 8, 2012
- Born: Bruce Allan Clark; 22 June 1944 (age 82)
- Education: University of Western Ontario LLB(1969); MA in North American constitutional history (1987); University of Aberdeen School of Law, Scotland PhD (1990)
- Occupation: lawyer
- Years active: 1971-
- Spouse: Margaret

Bruce Allan Clark (born 22 June 1944) is a Canadian native rights lawyer, writer and activist. He rose to attention as part of the Gustafsen Lake Standoff and its aftermath.

== Life and education ==
Clark graduated LLB from the University of Western Ontario in 1969, being called to the bar in 1971. He returned to higher education with an MA in North American constitutional history also from the UWO in 1987, followed in 1990 by a PhD in comparative law from the Department of Jurisprudence in the Faculty of Law in the University of Aberdeen School of Law, Scotland. For his dissertation, Clark investigated support of the proposition that the Privy Council recognized Indian sovereignty in the Privy Council decision in the 1704 Mohegan Indians v. Connecticut case. From this case, Clark concluded that Indian land claims in all of British North America would require an independent, third party adjudication.

== Clark's theories of sovereignty and genocide ==
Clark's 1990 book Native Liberty, Crown Sovereignty published by McGill–Queen's University Press was described as "widely researched, up-to-date, and persuasively argued" by the Canadian Book Review Annual. Native Liberty described how "native liberty and crown sovereignty complement each other in Canada" where the imperial British North America claimed overall sovereignty and delegated powers to colonial governments who in turn would accommodate the liberty of the natives. "The jurisdiction of federal and provincial governments to govern ceded territory is constitutionally counter-balanced by the jurisdiction of the aboriginal peoples to govern themselves upon territory they have not voluntarily ceded. Hansen describes Clark as a "controversial writer, and activist." He further noted that, "[d]espite his academic qualifications, Clark's behaviour in trials and hearings was characterized as 'unconventional' and 'unprofessional' resulting in numerous sanctions by the courts."

In his May 1991 article in Canadian Forum, Philip Raphals described Clark as "on a one-man crusade to get these arguments [as set out in Native Liberty, Crown Sovereignty] before the Supreme Court of Canada." Raphals cited a Queen's Law Journal review by Queen's University law professor, Noel Lyon, describing Native Liberty, as "[perhaps] the most important single piece of writing on the subject of Aboriginal rights in Canada" since the Supreme Court's 1973 decision in Calder v British Columbia (AG). In Native Liberty, Clark says that the "British Crown recognized the right to self-government for Indians on unceded lands" in the Royal Proclamation of 1763. This right has been "entrenched" in the Constitution Act, 1982 and therefore provides a "legal basis for native claims to self-government before the Supreme Court of Canada." In his article Raphals also cited Vice-Chief of the Grand Council of the Cree of Quebec, Diom Saganash, regarding Clark's approach. Saganash said, "I think he's right but there's no judge in the country who would agree to it." Assembly of First Nations (AFN) Vice Chief Lawrence Courtoreille asked, "Even supposing you got a piece of paper from the Supreme Court saying you had a right to self-government, then what? Who is going to enforce it?" While Clark's arguments may be valid, many regard "his quest as quixotic".

In Justice in Paradise, Clark described his journey in Europe in which he was essentially accusing North American judges of complicity in genocide. The Clark family were accompanied by Harold (Tsenhu'qw) Pascal representing the Lil'Wat nation. Tsenhu'qw had signed a petition asserting that Canada was "breaching existing international law relative to the liberty and possession of themselves and the Indigenous nations for whom they spoke, and that the consequence was genocide contrary" to the 1948 international Convention on the Prevention and Punishment of the Crime of Genocide.

While The Law Society of Upper Canada had dismissed attempts by the B.C. legal establishment to have Dr. Clark disbarred, ruling that "the genocide of which Mr. Clark speaks is real... we are sympathetic moreover to his assertion that the Courts have been unwilling to hear his argument."

According to The Globe and Mail, in her May 28, 2015, lecture at the Global Centre for Pluralism Chief Justice Beverley McLachlin said that Canada's attempt to commit "cultural genocide" against aboriginal people "that began in the colonial period" is the "worst stain on Canada's human-rights record". The Globe described her remarks as "unparalleled". According to Maclean's, on June 2, 2015, when Justice Murray Sinclair released the report of the Truth and Reconciliation Commission on the abuses of Aboriginal children in residential schools he used the phrase, "cultural genocide". He said, "Today, I stand before and acknowledge that what took place in residential schools amounts to nothing short of cultural genocide – a systematic and concerted attempt to extinguish the spirit of Aboriginal peoples." In 2018, Clark published Ongoing Genocide Caused by Judicial Suppression of the "Existing" Aboriginal Rights which includes essays that were published in Dissident Voice from the late 2000s onwards.

In a master's degree thesis, Paul Hanson compares Clark with scholars of "traditional Indigenous sovereignty" with "Taiaiake Alfred, Dale Turner, John Borrows, and Jean Cohen, each of whom offers unique, controversial, and sometimes disputed insights into sovereignty's meaning to Indigenous peoples." As a scholar, Clark has been compared with Taiaiake Alfred, who is also more inclined to take direct action, whereas Dale Turner, who calls for the "resurgence of indigeneity and traditional governance regimes", "approaches the issue from an intellectual, persuasive perspective" and is "reflective and open to reasoned discussion and negotiation." Clark "rejects most Indigenous law court decisions as ultra vires based on his formalist interpretation of historical documents, statutes, and proclamations." Hansen argues that John Borrows and Clark both "focus on judicial processes and outcomes" with Borrows "analyzing the Delgamuukw trials to demonstrate the courts' willful ignorance of Indigenous history and traditions." He describes Borrows as a "respected advocate for Indigenous causes" while grouping Clark with Russell Means and Pamela Palmater as "outspoken activists".

== Legal career ==
=== Land claim cases ===
Clark described how he first began working on native sovereignty law when he was retained by Temagami First Nation (the body politic of the Teme-Augama Anishnabai people) on February 11, 1973, to "defend their native sovereignty." The Temagami Land Caution was a claim filed with land offices in August 1973 that prevented development including mining on Crown land. According to Teme-Augama Anishnabai oral history, they had never signed a treaty. The Ontario government announced plans to build an $80 million ski resort on Maple Mountain, known as Chee'Bai'Gin or "Where the spirits go." The provincial government considered the mountain to be public land while the Teme-Augama Anishnabai claimed stewardship over the mountain.

In his book, Justice in Paradise, Clark described how he and his wife liquidated his law practice in southern Ontario, sold his home and assets, and took up residence in the remote Bear Island community from 1978 through 1985 where they brought up their young children. Early on Clark took an oath with Chief Gary Potts to "devote his life to the fight for Indian sovereignty", an oath that he kept even though his close relationship with Potts and involvement in the Bear Island case ended in 1985. According to Raphals, Clark worked without compensation but did have a promissory note, signed in 1984 by Chief Potts from the Teme-Augama (Temagami) Executive Council for $7 million. Clark eventually sued for payment and the relationship ended.

Lyn Crompton On July 12, 1990, members of the Lil'Wat Tribe blockaded Duffy Lake Road which crosses the Mount Currie reserve to prevent commercial loggers—International Forest Products Ltd. (Interfor)— from operating on Lil'Wat unceded traditional territories. In November 1990, their attorney Lyn Crompton began to consult "Clark on legal strategy". Clark became co-counsel with Crompton by the end of 1990 and he moved to B.C. to represent them. Interfor was granted an injunction against the blockade on February 2. On February 9, the RCMP raided the blockade before dawn and arrested 62 people. Clark represented them before B.C. Supreme Court judge Wetmore.

In March 1997, Ben Mahony interviewed William Jones Ignace (known as Wolverine, his Shuswap name). Wolverine (1932-2016), who was in jail waiting for his trial where Clark was his defense lawyer, explained that he had first met Clark when he was working on the Lil'Wat case in 1990. Wolverine went to the Mount Currie area to help. He and Clark "went to different courts on the Lower Mainland here trying to get the jurisdiction issue addressed. We've been stonewalled by the judicial system. I think it came out in court that Bruce has tried to have the jurisdiction argument addressed 41 different times...Then Bruce took a case and finally it got to the Supreme Court of Canada." Wolverine described how he consulted with Clark about strategies to advance their legal argument, to get it heard in the Supreme Court of Canada. "We took this to a panel of listeners of Indigenous peoples in Albuquerque, New Mexico in 1993. There I testified to the UN." Mahony asked confirmed that Wolverine to confirm that Clark had "testified that his mind and your mind are one and the same on issues of jurisdiction."

In his 2002 book, Struggle for the Land: Native North American Resistance to Genocide, Ecocide, and Colonization, University of Colorado's Ward Churchill described how Clark's "sovereignty defense" backfired in a case involving a Western Shoshone native near Crescent Valley, Utah, United States v. Dann. In the 1970s, the Western Shoshone sisters, Mary Dann and Carrie Dann were charged with trespassing by a US Bureau of Land Management (BLM) ranger on their generational land because they were grazing cows and horses. They "invoked aboriginal rights as their defense" and they have managed to remain on their lands as of 2002. Clifford Dann attempted to set himself on fire in November 1992 to block BLM from impounding their livestock. The BLM rangers who put out the fire arrested Dann and falsely accused him of assaulting them. Churchill said that in United States v. Dann, Clark had adopted a "strict 'sovereignty defense'" by "simply rejecting U.S. jurisdiction at trial." Colorado AIM leader Glenn Morris noted that "[w]hile Clark's position was technically correct, it would have been pertinent…to have also observed that Dann happened to be entirely innocent of the charges against him… [P]residing judge Bill McKibben imposed an especially harsh sentence because he wanted to make an example that U.S. law cannot be ignored." On May 17, 1993, Dann was sentenced to 9 months in prison, 2 years probation and a fine of $5,000.

In his career he litigated 40 cases in North America including in Alaska, Alberta, British Columbia, California, Maine, Nevada, New York, New Brunswick, Ontario, Quebec, Saskatchewan and Washington (DC).

== Gustafsen Lake ==
According to a 2011 article in the International Indigenous Policy Journal, Gustafsen Lake or Ts'peten in Shuswap, which is south of Williams Lake, and near 100 Mile House in British Columbia, in Secwepemec territory was a "popular camping and fishing area". The title for the lakeside location had been held by an American rancher from Montana, Lyle James, since 1972 for the James Cattle Company. Percy Rosette, a Shuswap native, made a verbal agreement with James in July 1989 allowing Rosette to use the "area for a period of four years under the condition that no permanent structures were erected on the site" to organize an annual ritual Sun Dance on the property. Working with his partner Mary Pena, they held their first Sun Dance at Gustafsen Lake in 1990 and it became an annual event. While researching land claims for the Shuswap Nation, Rosette found that the land they were using was owned by the Shuswap Nation, and he and John Stevens had contacting Clark to investigate the claim.

On January 3, 1995, Clark submitted a petition to Queen Elizabeth II, signed by Rosette and Stevens, in which they called for "third-party adjudication over unceded Indigenous lands within the contemporary boundaries of the Canadian state."

On June 13, 1995, after James had found a fence had been erected at the campsite, his ranchers allegedly "impaled" an eviction notice on a "sacred spear". The Sun Dancers claimed the fence was put up in May to keep cattle out of the Sun Dance area. At that time, the RCMP were involved as mediators in what they considered to be a "civil matter". Three Indigenous RCMP constables, Constables Charlie Andrew, Bob Wood, and George Findley, were involved in the mediation between James and the Sun Dancers. Wood attended a ceremony in mid-June and Andrew "attended the opening day of the ceremony". Constable Findley "was taken on a tour of the burial grounds and sacred [Sun Dance] arbour before he was invited to participate in prayer and a cleansing sweat with the Sun Dancers".

Wolverine described how Percy Rosette had asked him to come to Gustafsen lake on June 13. He and Clark arrived on June 14, 2015. Clark held meetings with the Gustafsen Lake Defenders, including Boncore at Count Henning Graf von Platen's guesthouse, Arcona House, in 108 Mile Ranch. Their role was "more or less to bring out the law, the law as I understand it. We had a meeting with two of the ranchers sons, one of his daughters. Three RCMP officers all came into the camp along with the Northern Shuswap Tribal Council." Wolverine told Mahony, that the "people in the tribal council, the Chief, tried to take over the meeting from that point on. I told him I didn't recognize him in having any say on the land issue because I said you are a civil servant therefore I don't want to hear from you because the people I work with are the elders of the Shuswap and Okanagan Confederacy. That Confederacy dates back to 1877 with the hereditary Chiefs."

The Sun Dance was held from July 2 through July 12, 1995 without incident with John Boncore, also known as Dacajeweiah or "Splitting the Sky", a member of American Indian Movement leading the Sun Dance ceremony. By August about twenty men, women and children remained onsite. In his 2001 book, Boncore said that they had felt that they were under attack and he "made the decision to mount an 'armed defensive stance'". Jones William Ignace, known as Wolverine, and Boncore, also known as Dacajeweiah or "Splitting the Sky", became the spokesmen for the group.

Over the next month with "400 RCMP officers and soldiers" against 18 protesters, the situation had escalated "into one of the costliest police operations in Canadian history". On September 11 RCMP and natives exchanged fire.

Rosette sought the assistance of Nakoda (Stoney) spiritual healer John Stevens, who was called to Gustafsen Lake "after long days in RCMP crosshairs". Using a radio-telephone at the camp, Rosette asked for Steven's guidance. Rosetta said that if "Stevens came to the camp and told the group to leave the camp, they would do so." The protesters who "believe in the hereditary and not the elected system of leadership", trusted Stephens. Thirteen men and five women were arrested. Chief Ovide Mercredi of the Assembly of First Nations (AFN) Ovide Mercredi blamed Clark for failed mediation attempts at Gustafsen Lake saying "Clark is using this situation as an opportunity to grandstand on his international tribunal theory. Somehow he has managed to convince some people in there that he's the way to get them sovereignty." However, according to Windspeaker, the protesters did not trust either Chief Ovide Mercredi of the Assembly of First Nations (AFN) or the Shuswap council because they "represent an extension of European-style government" whereas they trusted Stevens. The protesters "believe in the hereditary and not the elected system of leadership." (Note: Clark's critics said that the main plank of Clark's aboriginal title claim never had, or has anything to do with the "common law" for example, law based on [wordnetweb.princeton.edu/perl/webwn customary behavior] since at all material times it sheltered under the protection of the high contractual agreement between the great maritime powers of Europe—France, Netherlands, Portugal, Spain, Russia and United Kingdom—and by the written constitutions and original precedents of the United States and Canada that incorporate into themselves this European "doctrine of discovery" compact. The leading American case of Samuel Worcester settled this point in the course of holding Worcester's conviction was void, because states have no criminal jurisdiction in Indian Country, and this in turn was incorporated into the constitutional law of Canada.) (Note: The Assembly of First Nations is a federal association of First Nations. Aboriginal Affairs and Northern Development Canada defines "band" in the same way as have the federal Indian Acts namely: "band" is "A body of Indians for whose collective use and benefit lands have been set apart or money is held by the Crown, or declared to be a band for the purposes of the Indian Act. Each band has its own governing band council, usually consisting of one chief and several councillors. Community members choose the chief and councillors by election, or sometimes through custom. The members of a band generally share common values, traditions and practices rooted in their ancestral heritage. Today, many bands prefer to be known as First Nations," or "First Nations" of Canada, which term signifies the form of Indian government first constituted by the Canadian federal government's statute the Indian Act of 1876.)

Other observers place substantial blame with the RCMP, with RCMP Superintendent in Charge of the Gustafsen Lake standoff, Len Olfert, telling Sergeant Denis Ryan to "Kill this Clark and smear the prick and everyone with him."

By 2010, because of lessons learned at Gustafsen Lake, British Columbia had developed a "wide-ranging protocol on public safety co-operation" which was accepted nationally which included identifying "situations that could lead to crisis, provide for exchanging information on how to prevent it and facilitate debriefings during or after a conflict." In a 2010 interview with The Globe and Mail, Gary Bass, deputy commissioner for the RCMP, said that Gustafsen Lake was a "turning point" for him where he learned that "confrontations with First Nations could be avoided." He said that, the RCMP has worked on building "relationships and trust" so that the "chances of another Gustafsen happening are significantly lower." In "15 years, we have never had another major confrontation in this province."

=== Regina v. Mary Pena ===
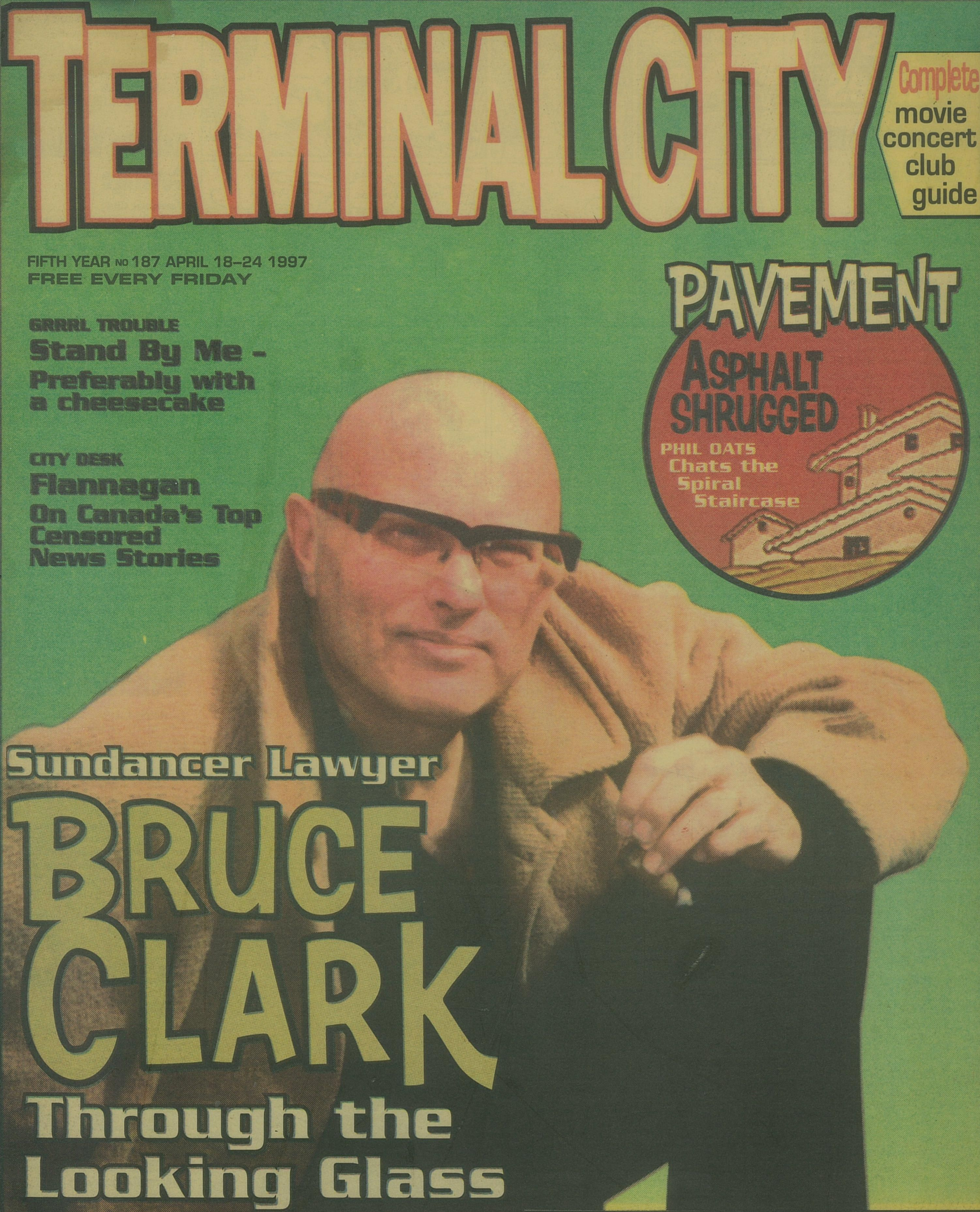
Photo of Bruce Clark on the cover of April 18, 1997 edition of Vancouver's Terminal City magazine

Bruce Clark was originally the chosen lawyer for some of the defendants in Regina v. Mary Pena. The trial took place from July 8, 1996, through 20 May 20, 1997 in a courthouse in Surrey, British Columbia. The trial ended with 39 acquittals and 21 convictions. The case against defendants Mary Pena, Ronald Dionne, Percy Rosette, Grant Archie, Brent Potulicki, Trond Halle, Edward Dick, Stuart Dick, Sheila Ignace, Francis Dick, Glen Deneault, Shelagh Franklin, James Pitawanakwat, William "Wolverine" Jones Ignace and his wife Flora Sampson (b.1942), their son Joseph (Jo Jo) Ignace (1972-2005), (Note: Jo Jo was represented by George Wool, of 100 Mile House.) Suniva Bronson, and Robert Flemming was filed on May 16, 1997. In the case Regina v. Mary Pena, Bruce Clark testified that he had told Doc Hill and William "Wolverine" Jones Ignace that during the occupation of the land, there were numerous statements by members of the encampment, mostly by Doc Hill (also known as Dacajeweiah, "Splitting the Sky" and John Boncore Hill) and William "Wolverine" Jones Ignace that "no Court in this country (including the Supreme Court of Canada) had accepted his argument on the law because, in effect, the Judges of this country are blinded by self interest. His advice was that only a "third party tribunal, one such as the Privy Council of Great Britain, would be sufficiently free of self interest to accede to what he believes to be his compelling and irrefutable argument on the law. It was that demand which was at the heart of the stand-off at Gustafsen Lake." Hill and Ignace said that "Bruce Clark has challenged even the whole colony of B.C., and their presence in native lands...that "Native nations have the right to sovereignty, free of any colonial regimes and restrictions."; "All unceded territory shall be left unmolested and undisturbed."; "B.C. [doesn't] have the right to set up government here in the province."; "Domestic laws don't apply in this situation here...they cannot charge us in any way because we are a sovereign people."; and that "We are standing on sovereign territory of the Shuswap nation."

According to Sandra Lambertus, defendants' lawyers said that a fair trial was jeopardized because of a number of factors including biased pre-trial media coverage. Witnesses for the defence, RCMP media liaison supported this allegation, and one journalist was identified as having contributed to an organized police media strategy in which the standoff was "portrayed as a war." According to Lambertus, Glavin (1996) and 100 Mile House Free Press, the media coverage of Gustafsen Lake standoff beginning with the RCMP media event at William Lake, was like "a circus coming to town" where a minor dispute was exaggerated and portrayed as an intense conflict. In 1997 one of the original lawyers for the defense, Janice Switlo, published a monograph in 1997 in which she challenges the claim by the British Columbia Attorney General and the RCMP that there was "only one side of the story concerning Gustafsen Lake". Lambertus cited Switlo as saying that "the other side of the story" reveals "the corruption, the abuse, the fraud" from federal and provincial levels of government as well as the RCMP during the conflict." Switlo also added that "the RCMP did not provide the media with accurate information during the conflict." Lambertus revealed that the media produced "561 newspaper stories from August 18, 1995 to September 19, 1995. Most journalist came from Vancouver and they depended on a good relationship with the RCMP to access the stories which, according to Lambertus, the RCMP used as leverage. Sergeant Peter Montague, RCMP media liaison for British Columbia described the media marketing program developed by the RCMP in the 1990s.

Judge Ian Bruce Josephson said in his reasons for judgement that, "While it was known that no court in the country had acceded to their position, they [the accused] had advice from [Bruce Clark] one lawyer licensed to practice law in some provinces that weapons could be employed in self defense, implying at least that this included defending possession of the land they were occupying."

One of the defendants in the case, James Allen Scott Pitawanakwat, was granted asylum in the United States in USA v. Pitawanakwat. In her ruling the Judge said that the Canadian government, in the Lake Gustafsen standoff—which she described as the biggest Canadian police or military land operation on land since the Korean War—had used a "disinformation campaign" to smear the defendants and had prevented the media from "learning and publicizing the true extent and political nature of the events."

At the end of the trial, defence lawyer Don Campbell, called for a public inquiry. Calls for a public inquiry were made by University of Lethbridge professor, Anthony Hall, who said that "the allegations of police and government wrong-doings are so serious that there is no question there should be a public inquiry into whether or not the rule of law was respected."

== Law Society of Upper Canada ==
According to Victoria Times Colonist, at 9:20 on Friday morning, September 15, Clark, entered the small 100 Mile House courthouse and demanded a hearing from Provincial Court Judge Nick Friesen. Judge Friesen denied his request saying that the Ottawa-based Clark "was not a member of the Law Society of B.C." (Note: Although inter-provincial representation on a case by case basis is as common in Canada as is inter-state representation in the United States, the reason for Clark's lack of a case license in British Columbia was that the bar association there refused to grant the normal dispensation to Clark. British Columbia Interprovincial Practice section 16(2) The benchers may permit qualified lawyers of other Canadian jurisdictions to practise law in British Columbia and may promote cooperation with the governing bodies of the legal profession in other Canadian jurisdictions by doing one or more of the following: (a) permitting a lawyer or class of lawyers of another province or a territory of Canada to practise law in British Columbia, Membership and Authority to Practise Law This representation was at a first appearance and bail hearing for which a licence to act for the defense on the merits is not required before speaking, especially on the critical constitutional question of the court's jurisdiction to proceed at all, i.e., habeas corpus. Habeas corpus, a Latin term meaning "you have the body," refers to the right of every prisoner to challenge the terms of his or her incarceration in court before a judge, Habeas corpus A defendant normally must disclose an objection going to jurisdiction at first opportunity. When Clark asked to file a habeas corpus objection to the court's assumption of jurisdiction, the judge answered by citing him for criminal contempt of court. The essence of contempt of court is that the misconduct impairs the fair and efficient administration of justice. Contempt statutes generally require that the actions present a Clear and Present Danger that threatens the administration of justice.) Clark gave the judge a nine-page document and said he was acting on pro bono basis for his clients. Clark, who was the counsel of choice for the Gustafsen Lake Defenders, wanted to file his clients' legal arguments in an effort to prevent the RCMP/Canadian Forces from using force against the 18 Gustafsen Lake protesters. The "courtroom had been locked and only the media, police, court staff and a few natives were present." Clark told the judge that the police had "denied him access to his clients and he has not been able to obtain "fresh instructions" from them." He learned that the Tribal Council had hired lawyers for his clients and that they would be representing them, not him. Police officers handcuffed Clark from behind. Seven Mounties and four sheriffs removed him from the courthouse. He was later charged with assaulting an officer. According to the article, in the struggle he called them, "Filthy god damn fascist goons. Just following orders is not an excuse for genocide since 1948... He accused the court of "being guilty of treason, fraud and complicity in genocide" He said, "This kangaroo court will not succeed. Judge Friesen cited Clark for contempt and told him he would see him in Williams Lake on Monday." Clark remained in a "holding cell for the weekend." On September 18, Clark was brought to court in manacles and leg shackles in front of the national media. Judge Friesen had Clark committed to the Riverview Forensic Institute, a hospital for the criminally insane, saying he was a "delusional paranoid". In a 2000 documentary entitled Above the Law 2: a critical look at Gustafsen Lake produced by Mervyn Brown, former US Attorney General Ramsey Clark said that Judge Friesen's accusation that Clark was mentally incompetent, which "no one believed", was a "despicable act". (Note: Both Switlo and Mahony (2001:293) cited an August 29, 1995 letter from Ramsey Clark to then-BC's attorney general Ujjal Dosanjh urging him to "pursue non-violent means of addressing the issues raised by the present confrontation... There is no justification for the use of force, or for conduct by law enforcement that might provoke violence. The emotionalized state of mind of all involved is clear. With the RCMP calling the Indians "thugs" and "terrorists" and promising force, the risk they will employ excessive, deadly force, causing bloodshed and loss of lives is overwhelming unless restraint is ordered... I urge you to act immediately to defuse a dangerous situation, to begin dialogue and to seek arbitration of all issues perhaps by an independent and impartial panel [containing] no Canadians and no Indians." Ramsey Clark agreed with the creation of a "third-party dispute mechanism" as recommended by Bruce Clark.) Clark skipped his October 18, 1995 court appearance before Judge Friesen in Williams Lake. Clark, his wife, their three children along with Harold (Tsenhu'qw) and Loretta (Lahalus) Pascal, Lil'Wat natives, flew to the Netherlands, to "explore international legal remedies". He returned to Canada and on February 18, 1997, police removed Clark from flight 911 as soon as it landed in Vancouver airport. The police immediately took him to the 100 Mile House courthouse where Judge Friesen presided as prosecutor and judge. Judge Friesen found Clark guilty, sentenced him to a 3-month prison term, and denied bail. BC solicitor Manuel Azevedo was his lawyer.

According to a June 2, 1997 series in Maclean's, Clark, and the defendants he represented, said that Canadian courts had "no jurisdiction over disputes involving Indian land never ceded through treaties". They called for "an impartial third-party tribunal". Clark spent two months in jail during the trial on contempt charges after calling an early Gustafsen hearing a "kangaroo court." In 1996 Clark attempted to make a citizen's arrest of the four British Columbia Court of Appeal (BCCA) judges who he had accused of treason and complicity to genocide.

According to an article in The Globe and Mail based on a June 19 Law Society of Upper Canada report the Globe had obtained on June 28, 1996, by Clayton Ruby and Gavin MacKenzie, although at first the Law Society of Upper Canada discipline panel report had considered 22 charges of alleged professional misconduct, including assault and illegal citizen's arrests, on June 19, 1996, the Law Society of Upper Canada acquitted Clark of 19 of the charges. (Note: In their decision June 19, 1996, the Board of Governors, the Benchers, wrote: "Although space does not permit a complete summary of Mr Clark's argument, it is based upon the proposition that certain native lands (or "hunting grounds") have never been properly surrendered to the Crown…Finally, Mr Clark argues, by usurping jurisdiction over the indigenous people living on unceded hunting grounds, the Canadian government, the legal establishment and domestic courts are contributing to and are complicit in the genocide of indigenous people.… [I]t is this argument that is at the root of the complaint of professional misconduct that the panel were called upon to deal with…Mr Clark is remarkably knowledgeable in the area of native rights, and the views that he espouses are honestly and sincerely held. It is accepted also that he believes that his comments as particularized in the complaint were intended to advance the cause of justice and the rule of law…all of the members of the panel were impressed with [his] presentation, his thoughtful remarks to us, his commitment to his cause, and the obvious sincerity of his beliefs. It is acknowledged that Mr Clark has made very significant family and financial sacrifices in pursuit of his quest for justice for his clients.…[He] has much to offer the legal profession.") The Society decided to not revoke Clark's right to practice. He was found guilty of "three counts of professional misconduct" and called to appear before the court to be reprimanded the attempted citizen's arrest of four British Columbia Court of Appeal Judges in January 1997.

Later, in 1999, at a second disbarment proceeding of the same Law Society, Clark was disbarred for his conviction by the British Columbia provincial court of criminal contempt of court and assault officer. Clark returned to Canada and was jailed in 1997 for three months. The convicting judge and disbarring panel of the Law Society apparently felt the Law Society as of June 19, 1996, misunderstood the facts, although for all that appears no fresh evidence was adduced or referenced.

On October 21, 2002, Clark stood before a 3-person Law Society of Upper Canada panel which included panel chair Alan Silverstein and law society lawyer Maureen Helt, to request to be reinstated. According to The Globe and Mail article which quoted Supreme Court Justice Antonio Lamer, who had called Clark " "a disgrace to the bar", Clark's case presented a "unique test" to the law profession where muting Clark's voice might result in lending "credence to his accusations against the legal establishment."

Subsequently, Clark applied for but was refused refugee status in Norway.

== Supreme Court of Canada ==
On September 12, 1995, Clark appeared before the Supreme Court of Canada as council on Delgamuukw v British Columbia in which Supreme Court Chief Justice Antonio Lamer declined to address constitutional challenges set forth by Clark. In response to Clark's statement that "the judiciary has engaged in fraud and genocide, by ignoring native sovereignty over vast tracts of land, including the disputed ranchland at Gustafsen Lake", Lamer responded that Clark was a "disgrace to the bar" and that [i]n my 26 years as a judge I've never heard anything so preposterous."

== Bibliography ==
- Indian Title in Canada. Carswell Law Publishers. 1987. p. 142. ISBN 978-0-459-30451-5.
- The right of Indian self-government in Canada (PhD thesis). University of Aberdeen. 1988. OCLC 53502064.
- Native Liberty, Crown Sovereignty: The existing aboriginal right of self-government in Canada. McGill-Queen's University Press. 1990. ISBN 978-0-7735-0767-8.
- Clark, Bruce A. (1999). Justice in Paradise. McGill-Queen's University Press. p. 440. ISBN 978-0-7735-2001-1. OCLC 951201352.
- Clark, Bruce A. (2008). Mattei, Ugo; Monti, Alberto (eds.). "Judicial Culpability for War and Genocide in the Age of American Empire". Global Jurist. 8 (3). doi:10.2202/1934-2640.1278. S2CID 143492837.
- Clark, Bruce A. (2018). Ongoing Genocide caused by Judicial Suppression of the "Existing" Aboriginal Rights. Electromagnetic Print. ISBN 978-1-7171-1091-6.
