= Killer Diller =

Killer Diller may refer to:

- Killer Diller (1948 film), an American musical race film
- Killer Diller, a novel by Clyde Edgerton
  - Killer Diller (2004 film), an adaptation of the novel
- A group of film executives, that were mentored by Barry Diller, see Barry Diller#"The Killer Dillers"
- A character in the comic strip Beetle Bailey
