= Terminal City =

Terminal City may refer to:

- A nickname for the city of Vancouver, British Columbia
- Terminal City (Manhattan), a development around Grand Central Terminal in New York City
- Terminal City (comics), two comic book limited series published by DC Comics under their Vertigo imprint
- Terminal City (magazine), a magazine distributed in the Vancouver area until October 2005
- Terminal City (TV series), a 2005 Canadian mini-series
- a novel by Linda Fairstein
- Terminal City Rollergirls, a Vancouver roller derby league
