= Single shot (disambiguation) =

Single-shot refers to firearms which hold only a single round of ammunition.

Single shot or single-shot may refer to:

- A Single Shot, 2013 American film
- One-shot (comics) also known as a single-shot comic, a term used in the American comic book industry to denote a pilot comic
- A single shot, or solo, of espresso coffee
- Single-shot cinematography, also known as a long take, in which film is shot uninterrupted for an atypically long time (in a single shot)
- Single-shot game or repeated game, a subject of game theory
