= Matthew F. Jones =

American novelist

Matthew F. Jones is an American novelist and screenwriter. Jones grew up in rural upstate New York and currently lives in Charlottesville, Virginia. His novels have been translated into various foreign languages and several times have been named on best novels of the year lists. Three of his novels, A Single Shot, Deepwater and Boot Tracks, have been made into major motion pictures. He has taught creative writing at a number of colleges and universities, including Randolph Macon College, Lynchburg College and the University of Virginia. He grew up on a horse and dairy farm in rural upstate New York and currently lives in Charlottesville, Virginia.

Patrick Andersen, in a Washington Post review of Jones's 2006 novel Boot Tracks, termed the phrase ‘literate noir’ to describe the tense, psychological nature of his work. And in a starred review of Jones's 1999 psychological thriller Deepwater, Booklist critic Bill Ott described Jones as a ‘leading contemporary author of country noir, a subgenre whose roots trace back to James M. Cain’s Post Man Always Rings Twice.’ A film version of Deepwater was released under the same name in 2006, starring Lucas Black, Peter Coyote and Lesley Ann Warren. Jones's own screenplay of his 1996 novel "A Single Shot" was made into a film of the same name in 2012 and released in 2013. The film version of the novel stars Sam Rockwell, William H. Macy, Jeffrey Wright, and Kelly Reilly.

== Bibliography ==
Novels

- The Cooter Farm (1992)
- The Elements of Hitting (1994)
- A Single Shot (1996)
- Blind Pursuit (1997)
- Deepwater (1999)
- Boot Tracks (2006)

== Filmography ==
- A Single Shot (2013)
