= 19th Youth in Film Awards =

1998 US media awards ceremony

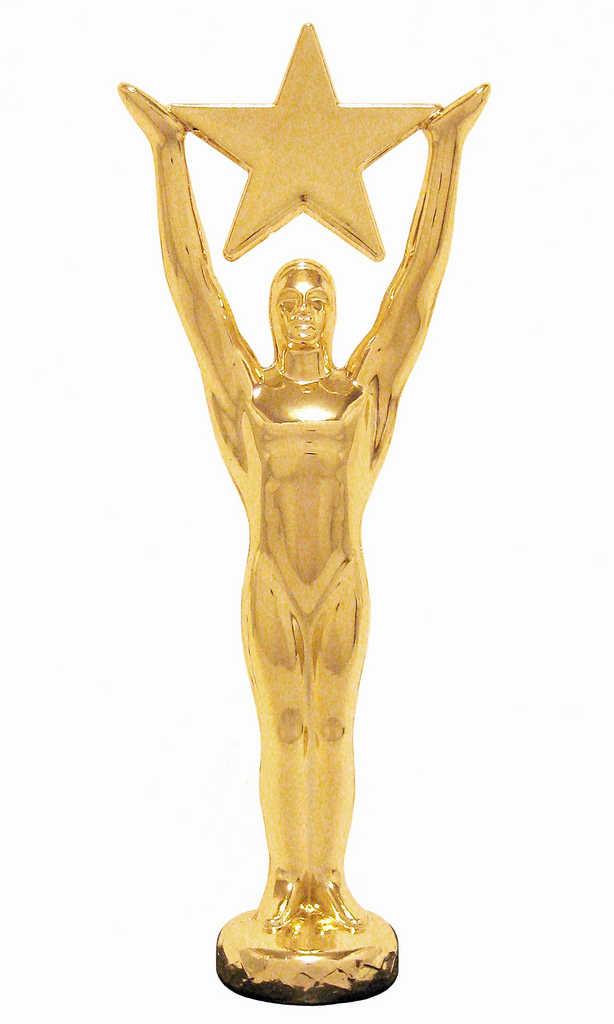
- Awarded for: Achievement in the 1996—1997 season
- Date: March 14, 1998
- Site: Hollywood, California
- Hosted by: Haley Joel Osment and Kimberly J. Brown

The 19th Youth in Film Awards ceremony (now known as the Young Artist Awards), presented by the Youth in Film Association, honored outstanding youth performers under the age of 21 in the fields of film, television and theatre for the 1996-1997 season, and took place on March 14, 1998, in Hollywood, California.

Established in 1978 by long-standing Hollywood Foreign Press Association member, Maureen Dragone, the Youth in Film Association was the first organization to establish an awards ceremony specifically set to recognize and award the contributions of performers under the age of 21 in the fields of film, television, theatre and music.

== Categories ==
★ Bold indicates the winner in each category.

== Best Young Performer in a Feature Film ==
=== Best Performance in a Feature Film: Leading Young Actor ===
★ (tie) Blake Heron - Shiloh
★ (tie) Kevin Zegers - Air Bud

- Mario Yedidia - Warriors of Virtue
- Blake Foster - Turbo: A Power Rangers Movie
- Brandon Hammond - Soul Food

=== Best Performance in a Feature Film: Leading Young Actress ===
★ Mara Wilson - A Simple Wish

- Florence Hoath - FairyTale: A True Story
- Christina Ricci - That Darn Cat
- Jurnee Smollett - Eve's Bayou
- Jennifer Love Hewitt - I Know What You Did Last Summer

=== Best Performance in a Feature Film: Supporting Young Actor ===
★ Jeremy Foley - Dante's Peak

- Erik Von Detten - Leave It to Beaver
- Adam Zolotin - Leave It to Beaver
- Elijah Wood - The Ice Storm
- Brendan Fletcher - Air Bud

=== Best Performance in a Feature Film: Supporting Young Actress ===
★ Jessica Biel - Ulee's Gold

- Vanessa Zima - Ulee's Gold
- Christina Ricci - The Ice Storm
- Rebecca Lee Meza - Selena

=== Best Performance in a Feature Film: Young Actor Age Ten or Under ===
★ Joseph Ashton - The Education of Little Tree

- Justin Cooper - Liar Liar
- Cameron Finley - Leave It to Beaver
- Alex D. Linz - Home Alone 3
- Vincent Berry - Free Willy 3: The Rescue

=== Best Performance in a Feature Film: Young Actress Age Ten or Under ===
★ Jamie Renée Smith - Dante's Peak

- Mika Boorem - The Education of Little Tree
- Danielle Wiener - Traveller
- Elizabeth Earl - FairyTale: A True Story

== Best Young Performer in a TV Movie, Pilot or Mini-Series ==
=== Best Performance in a TV Movie / Pilot / Mini-Series: Leading Young Actor ===
★ Gregory Smith - Shadow Zone: My Teacher Ate My Homework

- Robert Ri'chard - In His Father's Shoes
- Bradley Pierce - Doom Runners
- Lucas Black - Flash
- Joseph Cross - Northern Lights

=== Best Performance in a TV Movie / Pilot / Mini-Series: Leading Young Actress ===
★ Jena Malone - Ellen Foster

- Anna Chlumsky - A Child's Wish
- Anna Paquin - The Member of the Wedding
- Kirsten Dunst - Tower of Terror
- Ashley Peldon - The Westing Game (a.k.a. Get a Clue)

=== Best Performance in a TV Movie / Pilot / Mini-Series: Supporting Young Actor ===
★ Edwin Hodge - Shadow Zone: My Teacher Ate My Homework

- Phillip Van Dyke - The Ticket
- Kevin Zegers - A Call To Remember
- Tim Redwine - The Last Don
- Shawn Toovey - Flash
- Bill Switzer - The Christmas List

=== Best Performance in a TV Movie / Pilot / Mini-Series: Supporting Young Actress ===
★ Shadia Simmons - In His Father's Shoes

- Tina Majorino - Before Women Had Wings
- Kimberly J. Brown - Ellen Foster
- Allison Jones - Ellen Foster
- Mairon Bennett - Flood A River's Rampage
- Courtney Peldon - Little Girls in Pretty Boxes

=== Best Performance in a TV Movie / Pilot / Mini-Series: Young Actor Age 10 or Under ===
★ Seth Adkins - ...First Do No Harm

- Courtland Mead - The Shining
- Frankie Muniz -What the Deaf Man Heard
- Alex Trench - Oliver Twist
- Eric Lloyd - A Christmas Memory

=== Best Performance in a TV Movie / Pilot / Mini-Series: Young Actress Age 10 or Under ===
★ Kristen Bone - Flood: A River's Rampage

- Courtney Chase - Rose Hill
- Alexandra Purvis - Ronnie & Julie
- Dara Perlmutter - Shadow Zone: My Teacher Ate My Homework

== Best Young Performer in a TV Drama Series ==
=== Best Performance in a TV Drama Series: Leading Young Actor ===
★ (tie) Austin O'Brien - Promised Land
★ (tie) Michael Yarmush - My Life as a Dog

- David Gallagher - 7th Heaven
- Shawn Toovey - Dr. Quinn, Medicine Woman
- Eddie Karr - Promised Land

=== Best Performance in a TV Drama Series: Leading Young Actress ===
★ (tie) Beverley Mitchell - 7th Heaven
★ (tie) Sarah Schaub - Promised Land

- Jessica Bowman - Dr. Quinn, Medicine Woman
- Jessica Biel - 7th Heaven
- Larisa Oleynik - The Secret World of Alex Mack

=== Best Performance in a TV Drama Series: Supporting Young Actor ===
★ Ryan Merriman - The Pretender

- Shane Sweet - The Journey of Allen Strange
- Jimmy Galeota - Michael Hayes

=== Best Performance in a TV Drama Series: Supporting Young Actress ===
★ Brittany Tiplady - Millennium

- Caitlin Wachs - Profiler
- Mackenzie Rosman - 7th Heaven

=== Best Performance in a TV Drama Series: Guest Starring Young Actor ===
★ Trevor O'Brien - Promised Land

- Bradley Pierce - Touched by an Angel
- Jeremy Foley - Buffy the Vampire Slayer
- Zackery McLemore - Gun
- Zachary Browne - The Pretender
- Haley Joel Osment - Walker, Texas Ranger
- Bobby Brewer - 7th Heaven

=== Best Performance in a TV Drama Series: Guest Starring Young Actress ===
★ Cara Rose - Touched by an Angel

- Allison Bertolino - Party of Five
- Molly Orr - 7th Heaven
- Courtney Jacquin - EZ Streets
- Danielle Wiener - 7th Heaven
- Lauren Diewold - Millennium
- Aria Noelle Curzon - The Adventures of A.R.K.

== Best Young Performer in a TV Comedy Series ==
=== Best Performance in a TV Comedy Series: Leading Young Performer ===
★ Melissa Joan Hart - Sabrina the Teenage Witch

- Ben Savage - Boy Meets World
- Mike Damus - Teen Angel
- Corbin Allred - Teen Angel
- Tahj Mowry - Smart Guy
- Jordan Wall - Wishbone
- Brandy Norwood - Moesha

=== Best Performance in a TV Comedy Series: Supporting Young Actor ===
★ Kyle Sabihy - Hiller and Diller

- Brandon Hammond - The Gregory Hines Show
- Benjamin Salisbury - The Nanny
- Justin Berfield - Unhappily Ever After
- Rahi Azizi - Space Cases

=== Best Performance in a TV Comedy Series: Supporting Young Actress ===
★ Michelle Trachtenberg - Meego

- Kaitlin Cullum - Grace Under Fire
- Faryn Einhom - Hiller and Diller
- Madeline Zima - The Nanny
- Alex McKenna - You Wish

=== Best Performance in a TV Comedy Series: Guest Starring Young Actor ===
★ Kyle Gibson - Jenny

- Billee Thomas - The Parent 'Hood
- Miles Marsico - Johnnytime
- Cody McMains - The Parent 'Hood

=== Best Performance in a TV Comedy Series: Guest Starring Young Actress ===
★ Sydney Berry - 3rd Rock from the Sun

- Emily Hart - Sabrina, the Teenage Witch
- Mika Boorem - The Drew Carey Show
- Cara Rose - Ellen

=== Best Performance in a TV Comedy Series: Young Actor Age Ten or Under ===
★ Jonathan Osser - Hiller and Diller

- Michael Finiguerra - Soul Man
- Angelo Massagli - Cosby
- Haley Joel Osment - Murphy Brown
- Curtis Williams - The Parent 'Hood

=== Best Performance in a TV Comedy Series: Young Actress Age Ten or Under ===
★ Madylin Sweeten - Everybody Loves Raymond

- Jillian Berard - Hiller and Diller
- Courtney Chase - Soul Man
- Ashli Amari Adams - The Parent 'Hood

== Best Young Performer in a TV Daytime Drama ==
=== Best Performance in a Daytime Drama: Young Performers (Male & Female) ===
★ Collin O'Donnell (Male) - Days of Our Lives
★ Kimberly J. Brown (Female) - Guiding Light

- Bryant Jones - The Young and the Restless
- Christian Siefert - As the World Turns
- Camryn Grimes - The Young and the Restless

== Best Young Performer in a Voice-Over ==
=== Best Performance in a Voice-Over - TV or Film: Young Actor ===
★ Mathew Valencia - The New Batman Adventures

- Ryan O'Donohue - Recess
- Sam Gifaldi - Hey Arnold!
- Phillip Van Dyke - Hey Arnold!
- Josh Keaton - Hercules

=== Best Performance in a Voice-Over - TV or Film: Young Actress ===
★ Francesca Smith - Hey Arnold!

- Anndi McAfee - Recess
- Aria Noelle Curzon - Annabelle's Wish
- Ashley Peldon - Cats Don't Dance
- Lindsay Louie - Sing Me A Song

== Best Young Ensemble Performance ==
=== Best Performance in a TV Movie or Feature Film: Young Ensemble ===
★ The Right Connections

Elizabeth Hart, Emily Hart, Alexandra Hart-Gilliams, Brian Hart, Melissa Joan Hart

- Ditchdigger's Daughter

Adrienne Monique Coleman, Jameelah Nuriddin, Kiara Tucker, Rae'Ven Kelly, Malaika Jabali, Niaja Cotton

- Rose Hill

Kevin Zegers, David Klein, Blair Slater, Michael Alexander Jackson

- Under Wraps

Mario Yedidia, Adam Wylie, Clara Bryant

== Best Family Entertainment ==
=== Best Family TV Movie / Pilot / Mini-Series (Network) ===
★ ...First Do No Harm - ABC

- Ellen Foster - CBS
- Miracle in the Woods - CBS
- What the Deaf Man Heard - CBS
- Oliver Twist - ABC
- Flash - ABC

=== Best Family TV Movie / Pilot / Mini-Series (Cable) ===
★ The Right Connections - Showtime

- Under Wraps - Disney
- Whiskers - Showtime
- Ditchdigger's Daughters - Family Channel
- The Christmas List - Family Channel
- Little Girls in Pretty Boxes - Lifetime Channel

=== Best Educational TV Show ===
★ Bear in the Big Blue House - Disney Channel

- Bill Nye the Science Guy - PBS
- Wishbone - PBS
- Skinnamarink TV - The Learning Channel
- Wild About Animals - ABC

=== Best Family TV Comedy Series ===
★ Sabrina the Teenage Witch - ABC

- Soul Man - ABC
- The Gregory Hines Show - CBS
- Everybody Loves Raymond - CBS
- The Parent 'Hood - WB
- Teen Angel - ABC

=== Best Family TV Drama Series ===
★ (tie) Promised Land - CBS
★ (tie) 7th Heaven - WB

- Touched by an Angel - CBS
- The Secret World of Alex Mack - Nickelodeon
- The Journey of Allen Strange - Nickelodeon

== Youth In Film's Special Awards ==
=== The Jackie Coogan Award ===
==== Outstanding Contribution to Youth Through Motion Pictures ====
★ The Education of Little Tree - Paramount

=== The Michael Landon Award ===
==== Outstanding Contribution to Youth Through Television ====
★ Bryton McClure

=== Outstanding Young Performer in a Television Commercial ===
★ Alan James Morgan - Target Corporation

=== Outstanding Young Performers Live Theatre ===
★ Blake McIver Ewing
★ Danielle Wiener

=== Scholarship Recipients ===
★ Michael Seale, Jr.
★ Josh Evans

=== Best Family Feature Films ===
★ Animation: Anastasia - 20th Century Fox
★ Comedy: Air Bud - Disney

=== Best Family Foreign Film ===
★ Ponette (France) - Arrow Releasing

=== Best Young Performers in a Foreign Film ===
★ Victoire Thivisol - Ponette (France)
★ Misha Philipchuk - The Thief (Russia)

=== Former Child Star Lifetime Achievement Award ===
★ Gigi Perreau
