= Gary Potts =

Temagami First Nation chief (1944–2020)

Gary Potts (Dec. 1, 1944 – June 3, 2020) was a chief of the Temagami First Nation and the Teme-Augama Anishnabai in Temagami, Ontario, Canada. He was chief in August 1973 when the Temagami Land Caution began with land claims being filed with title offices to prevent development on Crown land.

Potts was a leader of the Red Squirrel Road blockades in 1988–1989, which were a part of Temagami's struggle to protect their Homeland. Bruce Clark, who was a lawyer for the Temagami First Nation throughout the 1970s and 1980s, left after Steele J.'s trial decision (1984) when the Temagami Band Council retained the services of an experienced Appeal Court Lawyer at the Firm of Borden & Elliot in Toronto (1985). Potts was chief in 1991 when the Supreme Court of Canada ruled that the Teme-Augama Anishnabai gave up rights to the land via the 1850 Robinson Treaty despite the Tema-Augama Anishnabai claiming that they never signed or consented to the treaty. The Supreme Court of Canada found that The Crown had breached some of their Fiduciary Obligations to the Temagami Indians.

Potts was chief for a few months in 2009. He died on June 3, 2020.
