= University of Aberdeen School of Law =

Law school in Aberdeen City, Scotland

Coordinates: 57°09′55″N 2°06′04″W

- Sgoil Lagha Oilthigh Obar Dheathain
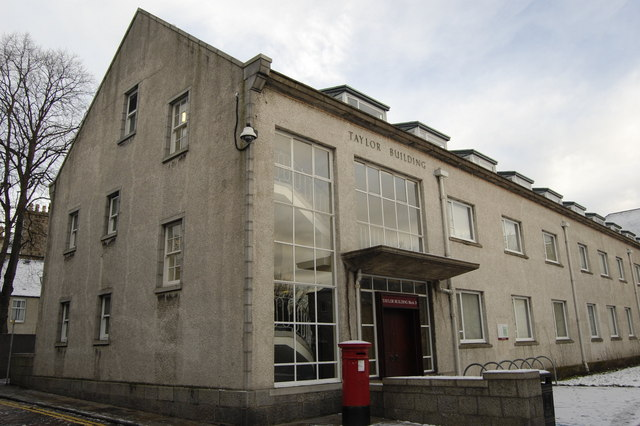
- The Taylor Building (2009)
- Type: Law school
- Established: c. 1495; 531 years ago
- Parent institution: University of Aberdeen
- Head: Justin Borg-Barthet
- Faculty: 60 faculty members
- Students: 1200 approx.
- Undergraduates: 900
- Postgraduates: 350
- Doctoral students: 60
- Location: Aberdeen, Scotland
- Campus: Old Aberdeen
Colours
- Website: abdn.ac.uk/law

The University of Aberdeen School of Law (Scottish Gaelic: Sgoil Lagha Oilthigh Obar Dheathain) is the law school of University of Aberdeen, located in Aberdeen, Scotland. Established in 1495, it is consistently ranked among the top 10 law schools in the United Kingdom.

Today, it is one of the oldest, largest, selective and prestigious law schools in Scotland, admitting some two hundred and fifty students each year, as well as over forty international exchange students. The 2021 Complete University Guide league rankings placed Aberdeen at 6th in the UK. The 2019 The Times league rankings also placed Aberdeen at 7th in the UK.

The School offers both undergraduate (LL.B.) and taught and research postgraduate degrees (LL.M.), as well as the Diploma in Legal Practice and Professional Competence Course. The current Head of the School of Law is Professor Justin Borg-Barthet.

== History and tradition ==
=== Founding ===
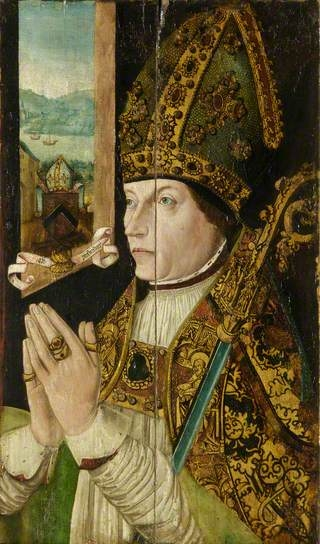
William Elphinstone (1431–1514) was a Scottish statesman, first Professor of Law at the university (1505–14), Bishop of Aberdeen and founder of the University of Aberdeen.

The history of the School of Law began with the establishment in 1495 of King's College, Aberdeen, the original university in Aberdeen, by William Elphinstone, then Bishop of Aberdeen and himself a former lawyer. From 1505 onwards, King's College endowed two professors of law- one for Canon law, another for Civil Law. Canon law ceased to be taught at King's College due to the Reformation which saw a purging of King's professors. The latter, Civil Law, would continue to be taught at King's College, subsequently in the United University, until today.

In 1860, King's College merged with Aberdeen's other university, Marischal College, to form the current University. However, it was not until 1895 that John Dove Wilson revived Scots Law at Aberdeen as a B.L. (Bachelor of Laws) and 1910 as the LL.B. degree.

=== Professorships ===
Traditionally there are four statutory professorships at the University of Aberdeen's School of Law: Professor of Jurisprudence, Professor of Scots Law, Professor of Civil Law, Professor of Public Law.

The tradition have produced scholars such as: Neil Kennedy, Lord Kennedy, who was a professor of Law and served as the first chairman of the Scottish Land Court (1912−18); Sir Thomas Broun Smith who became Professor of Scots Law (1949) and was Dean of the Faculty of Law between 1950−53 and 1956−58; or Peter Stein who was Professor of Jurisprudence from 1956 to 1968 and later became the Regius Professor of Civil Law at the University of Cambridge.

=== Academic dress ===
Academic dress has been worn in the University of Aberdeen since mediaeval times. Academic dress is usually worn only at formal occasions, such as at graduation, Founder's Day, or academic processions which take place for ceremonial reasons.

- Bachelor of Laws (LL.B.), black silk, lined with pale blue silk;
- Master of Laws (LL.M.), white silk, lined with pale blue silk;
- Doctor of Laws (LL.D.), the Doctor's Scarlet cloth gown distinguished by pale blue silk facings and sleeve linings. Sleeves will have a pale blue tassel and button, and John Knox Cap.

== Academics ==
=== Reputation and rankings ===
Rankings
National rankings
- Complete (2027): 17
- Guardian (2026): 11
- Times / Sunday Times (2026): 9

Global rankings
- QS (2027): 201-250

The 2021 Complete University Guide league rankings placed Aberdeen at 6th in the UK. The 2019 The Times league rankings also placed Aberdeen at 7th in the UK.

In the 2008 Research Assessment Exercise (RAE), the School submitted 35.7 FTE staff, the third-highest number of legal research staff in Scotland, after Glasgow (37.95) and Edinburgh (48.74). Five of the School's research submissions were rated the highest 4*, the same number as Dundee and Stirling, but behind Glasgow's fifteen, Strathclyde's twenty and Edinburgh's thirty. The School achieved thirty 3*, forty-five 2* and twenty 1* submissions.

=== Research Centres ===
School of Law has developed five Research Centres:

- Research Centre for Commercial Law
- Research Centre for Constitutional and Public International Law
- Research Centre for Energy Law
- Research Centre for Private International Law
- Research Centre for Scots Law

=== Aberdeen Summer Program ===
In addition, the School of Law plays host to the annual Aberdeen Summer Program in co-operation with the University of Baltimore School of Law and University of Maryland School of Law. The course examines comparison of U.S. and U.K. law, and is taught by Scottish and American tutors. Twenty American law students participated in the 2008 program, and thirty-two American law students were enrolled in the 2009 program.

=== International Exchange ===
In between years 2 and 3 of the LLB (with a language or European Legal Studies) course, students are given the opportunity to spend time studying in another country, learning its respective legal system and possibly its language. Current options open to students include the Université Libre de Bruxelles and Katholieke Universiteit Leuven in Belgium, Aarhus Universitet in Denmark, the University of Helsinki in Finland, the University of Auvergne, Pierre Mendès-France University and Lumière University Lyon 2 in France, the Universities of Freiburg, Marburg and Regensburg in Germany, Maastricht University in the Netherlands, the University of Bergen in Norway, Universidad de Deusto and Universidad de Sevilla in Spain, and the Universities of Stellenbosch and Cape Town in South Africa.

=== Aberdeen Student Law Review ===
The Aberdeen Student Law Review (ASLR) is a student run academic law review founded in 2010. The ASLR is entirely managed, written, edited and peer-reviewed by Students and Alumni of the University of Aberdeen. It is sponsored by Stronachs LLP who also provide a prize for the best submission to the review. The Hon. Lord Woolman acts as Honorary Editor and Patron of the ASLR.

== Facilities ==
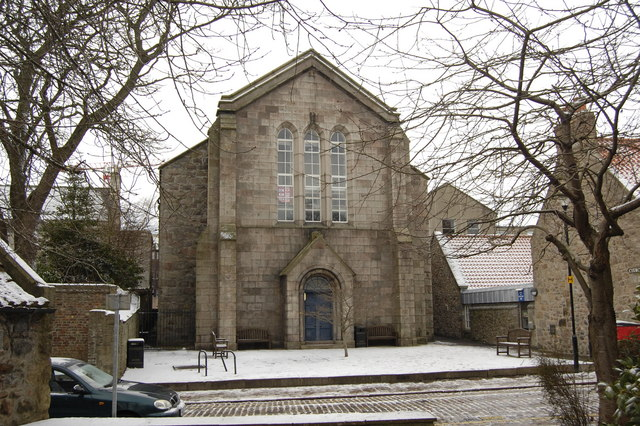
Before the completion of Taylor Building, the entire Law Faculty occupied the top floor of St Mary's.

The Taylor Building and Taylor Library at the School of Law are named in honour of Professor Thomas Murray Taylor (1897–1962), Scottish advocate and Vice-Chancellor of the University of Aberdeen.

=== Taylor Building ===
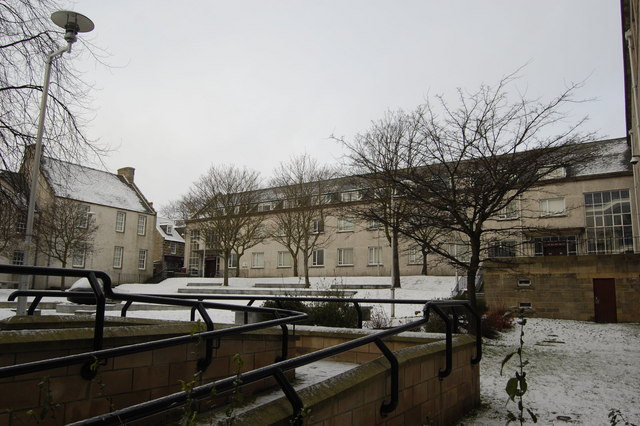
Courtyard of the Taylor Building (2009)

The university taught law at Marischal College until the expansion of King's College. The School of Law and its Library subsequently moved to St. Mary's buildings until once again, was moved to its current accommodation in the Taylor Building.

=== Taylor Library ===
The School of Law maintains its own Library located in the Taylor Building at King's College campus. It occupies two floors and play host to the university's European Documentation Centre. It currently holds over 30,000 books and is equipped with over 190 study spaces along with collaborative rooms for both staff and students.

== Notable people ==
=== Alumni ===
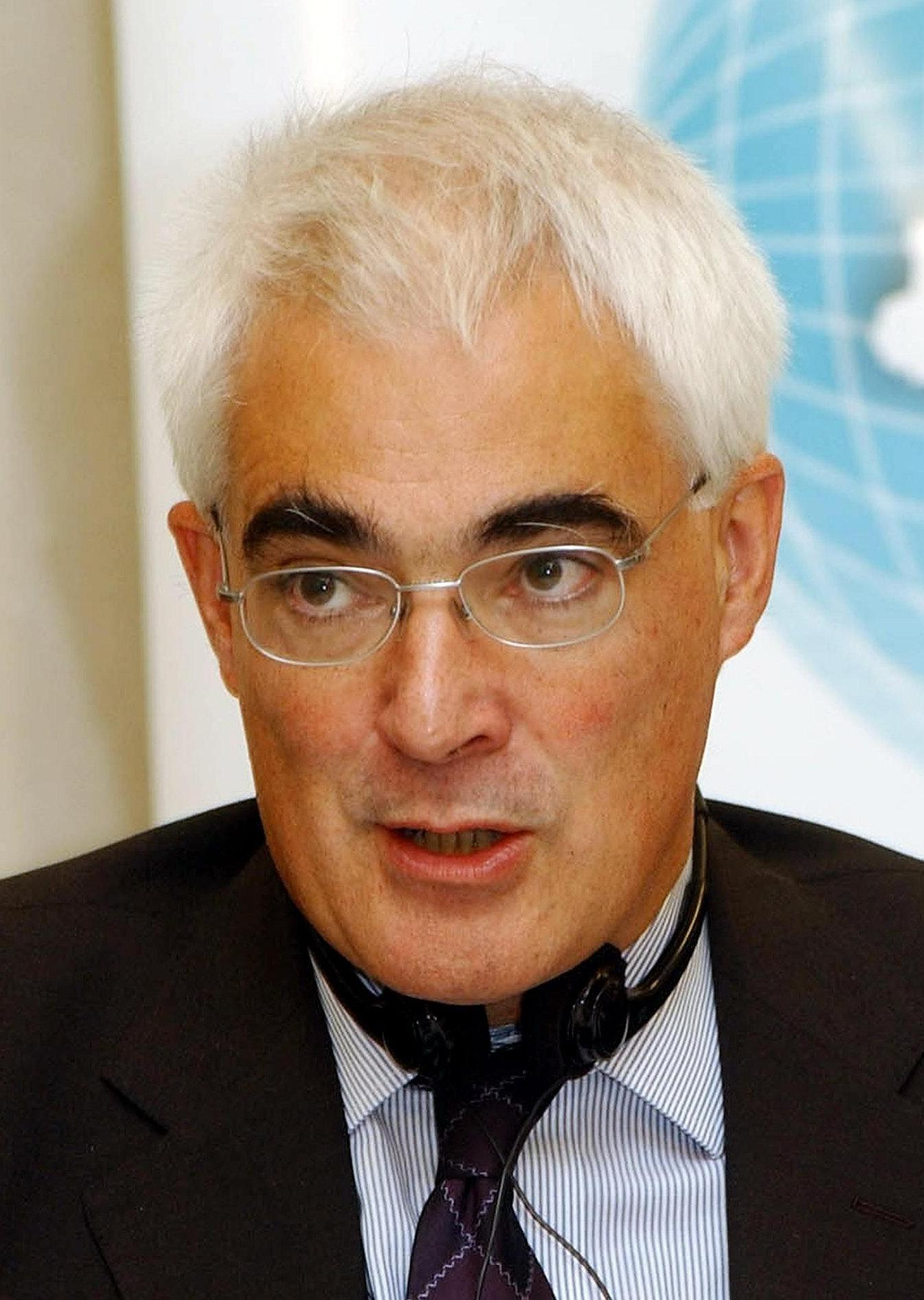
Alistair Darling

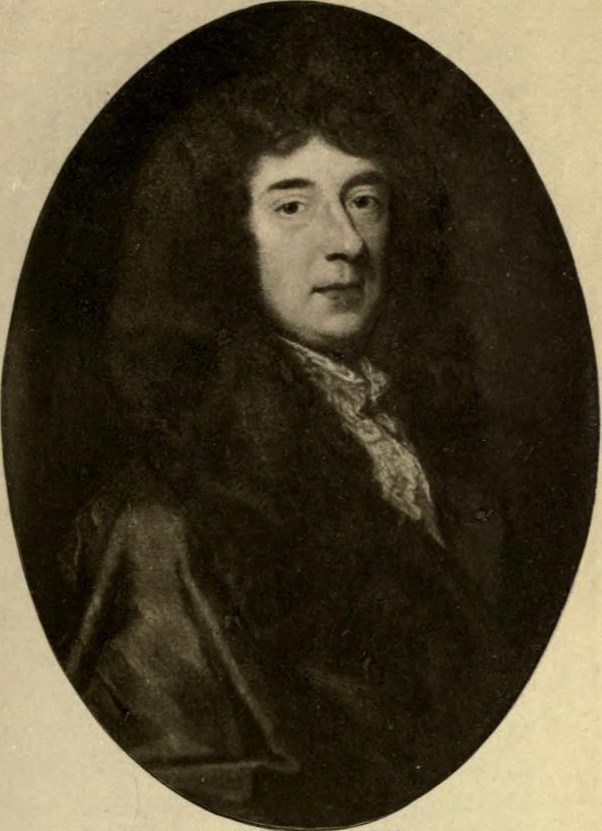
Sir George Mackenzie

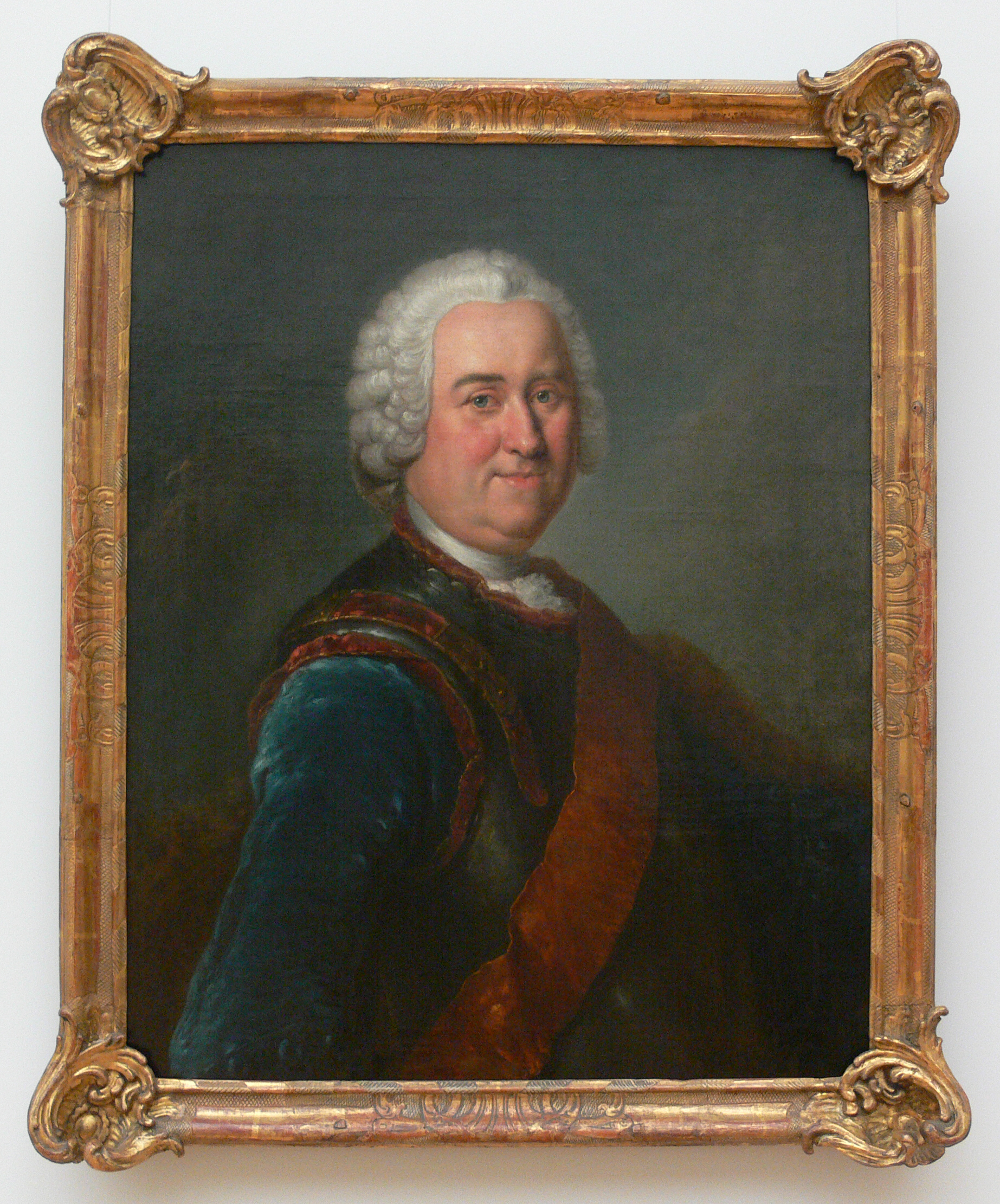
James Francis Edward Keith

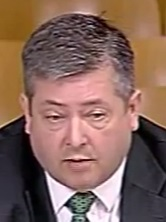
Frank Mulholland

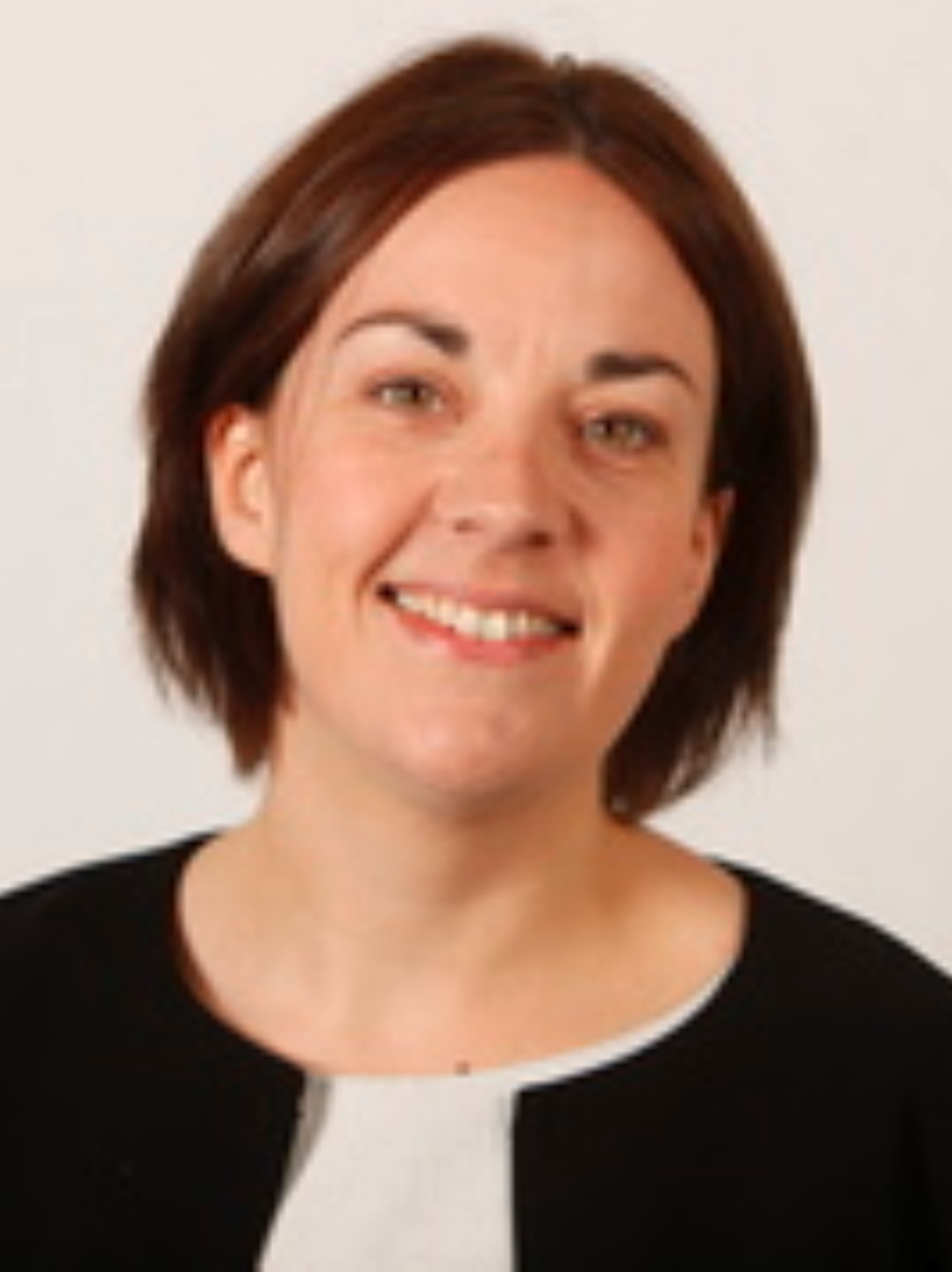
Kezia Dugdale

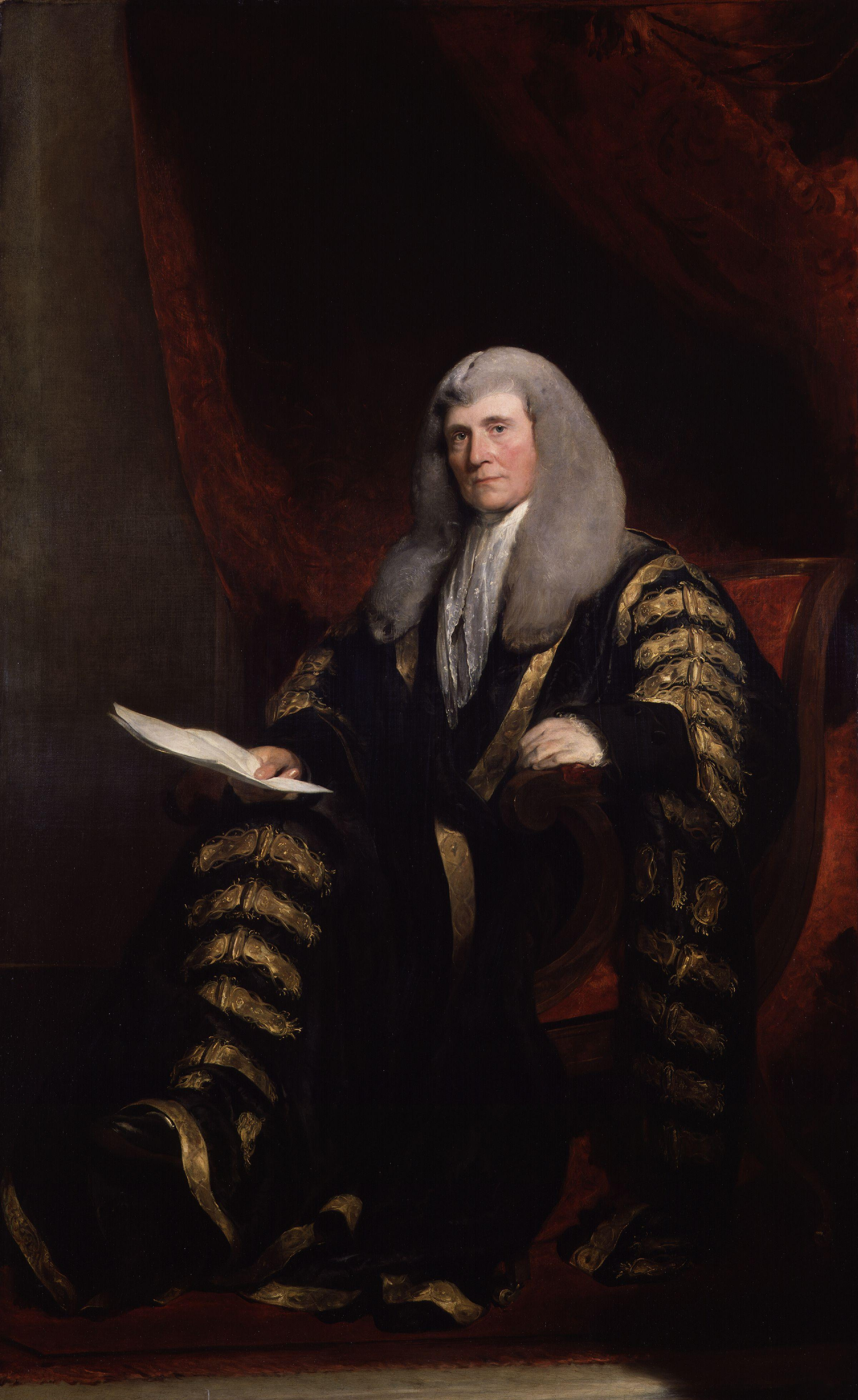
Sir William Grant
- Alistair Carmichael: Liberal Democrat Member of Parliament for Orkney and Shetland (2001–present), Secretary of State for Scotland (2013–15)
- Alistair Darling: Chancellor of the Exchequer (2007–10)
- Bruce Allan Clark: Canadian native rights lawyer
- James Francis Edward Keith: Jacobite and Prussian Field Marshal under Frederick the Great
- John Rose: Minister of Finance of Canada (1867), Solicitor General of Canada (1857−59), Member of Parliament for Huntingdon, Quebec (1867−69)
- Duncan Forbes: Lord President of the Court of Session (1737−48), Member of Parliament for Inverness Burghs (1722−37)
- Sylvester Douglas: Chief Secretary for Ireland (1793−94), Member of Parliament for Midhurst (1796−1800), Hastings (1802−06)
- James Stephen: Abolitionist lawyer, drafted the Slave Trade Act 1807 for William Wilberforce, Member of Parliament for Tralee (1808−1812)
- Alexander Asher: Dean of the Faculty of Advocates (1895−1905), Member of Parliament for Elgin Burghs (1881−1905)
- A. Gail Prudenti: Former Judge of New York State Supreme Court, Dean of Hofstra University Law School (2017− present)
- James MacKintosh: Recorder (Chief Judge) of Bombay (1804−1811), author of Vindiciae Gallicae: a defence of the French Revolution, Member of Parliament for Nairn (1813−18), Knaresborough (1818−32)
- John Hill Burton: Historiographer Royal (1867−1881)
- Katy Clark: Member of Parliament for North Ayrshire and Arran (2005−2015)
- Alexander Seton: Senator of the College of Justice (1682−1688), Member of Parliament for Aberdeenshire (1681−1686)
- William Hunter: Member of Parliament for Aberdeen North (1885−1896)
- The Hon. Lady Dorrian: Senator of the College of Justice (2005–present), Lord Justice Clerk 2016–present
- James Burnett, Lord Monboddo: founder of modern historical linguistics, Senator of the College of Justice (1767−1799), evolutionary thinker.
- Francis Grant, Lord Cullen: Senator of the College of Justice (1709−1726).
- William Barclay: former Counsellor of State for Charles III, professor of Civil Law at Angers.
- Frank Maguire: noted solicitor advocate, campaigner for victims of injustice.
- Colin Campbell: former Vice Chancellor of the University of Nottingham (1988−2008).
- Sir William Grant: Master of the Rolls (1801−17), Member of Parliament for Banffshire (1796−1812)
- George Gordon: Lord Chancellor of Scotland (1682−88), Lord President of the Court of Session (1681−82)
- Morag Wise, Lady Wise: Senator of the College of Justice (2013− present )
- Priyantha Jayawardena: Judge of the Supreme Court of Sri Lanka (2012− present )
- Alexander Forbes Irvine: Co-founder of the New Spalding Club, Vice Dean of the Faculty of Advocates (1858−91)
- Cosmo Gordon: Co-founder of the Royal Society of Edinburgh and advocate.
- Robert Forbes Combe: Winner of the 1946 British Chess Championship.
- James Ferguson, Lord Pitfour: Dean of the Faculty of Advocates (1760−1764), Senator of the College of Justice (1764−1776)
- Gilbert Burnet: Bishop of Salisbury (1689−1715), confidant to William III.
- Sir George Mackenzie: Lord Advocate (1677–88), founder of Advocate's Library, Edinburgh, institutional writer
- Murdo Fraser: Deputy Leader of the Scottish Conservatives in the Scottish Parliament and MSP for Mid Scotland and Fife (2003–present)
- The Rt Hon. Lord Marnoch: Senator of the College of Justice (1990–2005)
- Frank Mulholland, Lord Mulholland QC: Senator of the College of Justice since 2016, former Lord Advocate (2011−2016), Solicitor General (2007–2011)
- Nicol Stephen: Former leader of the Scottish Liberal Democrats
- Rebstar: Swedish recording artist and hip hop mogul (2007−2008)
- John West: Depute Provost of Aberdeen (2007−2009)
- The Hon. Lord Woolman: Senator of the College of Justice (2008–2023)
- Kezia Dugdale: Leader of the Scottish Labour Party (2015–17) and MSP for Lothian (2011–present)

=== Faculty ===
- William Elphinstone: First Professor of Law at the university (1505−14), founder of King's College, Aberdeen.
- David Daube: Professor of Jurisprudence (1951−55), Regius professor of Civil Law (Oxford) (1955−70), taught noted figures such as Lee Kuan Yew.
- George Grub: Professor of Law at the university (1881–91)
- Neil Kennedy: first Chairman of the Scottish Land Court (1912−18), Professor of Law at the university (1901−07)
- Peter Stein: Professor of Jurisprudence at the university (1956−68), Regius professor of Civil Law (Cambridge) (1968−1993).
- George Nicholson: Professor of Civil Law at King's College (1673−84), Senator of the College of Justice (1685−1711)
- Thomas Smith: Professor of Scots Law and Dean of the university's Law School. Professor of Civil Law at Edinburgh (1968−72)
- James Scougal: Professor of Civil Law at King's College (1684−87), Senator of the College of Justice (1687−)
- David Dalrymple: Professor of Civil Law at King's College (1763−66), Senator of the College of Justice (1777−84)
- John Lesley: Professor of Canon law at King's College (1561−), Bishop of Ross, Senator of the College of Justice (1565−1596), secretary to Mary, Queen of Scots.
