= Lucas Black =

American actor (born 1982)

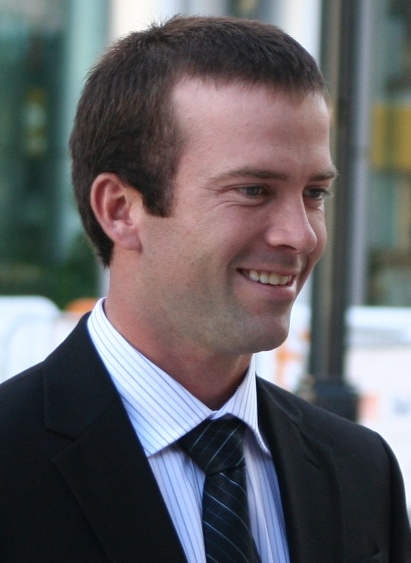
- Black at the 2009 Toronto Film Festival
- Born: November 29, 1982 (age 43); Decatur, Alabama, U.S.
- Occupation: Actor
- Years active: 1994–present
- Political party: Republican
- Spouse: Maggie O'Brien (m. 2010)
- Children: 3

Lucas York Black (born November 29, 1982) is an American actor. He plays Sean Boswell in the Fast & Furious films The Fast and the Furious: Tokyo Drift (2006), Furious 7 (2015), and F9 (2021). He also stars in various television series aired on CBS, including American Gothic (1995–1996) and NCIS: New Orleans (2014–2019). His other notable films include Sling Blade (1996), Cold Mountain (2003), Friday Night Lights (2004), Jarhead (2005), Legion (2010), and 42 (2013).

== Early life ==
Black was born November 29, 1982, in Decatur, Alabama, to Jan Gillespie, an office worker, and Larry Black, a museum employee. He has two older siblings and was raised a Southern Baptist. He grew up in Speake, Alabama, played football for the Speake Bobcats, and graduated from high school in May 2001.

== Career ==
At age 11, Black made his film debut in Kevin Costner's film The War. He subsequently was cast as Caleb Temple in CBS's television series American Gothic, which ran from 1995 to 1996, and in the films Sling Blade, Ghosts of Mississippi, and The X-Files. Later Black starred as Conner Strong in the TV film Flash (1997), which aired on The Wonderful World of Disney; in the movie his character visits a horse every day in the hope of buying it.

Black played a supporting role as Oakley in the historical drama Cold Mountain (2003). In 2004, he starred as Vernon, an autistic piano prodigy, in the indie musical drama Killer Diller (2004), and as Mike Winchell in the football-themed drama Friday Night Lights (2004), directed by Peter Berg.

Black starred as Nat Banyon in the indie thriller film Deepwater (2005), directed by David S. Marfield; as Chris Kruger in the Gulf War-themed drama film Jarhead (2005), directed by Sam Mendes; and as Sean Boswell in the third Fast and Furious film, The Fast and the Furious: Tokyo Drift (2006), directed by Justin Lin. He described Tokyo Drift as the one in which he "had the most fun."

Black starred as Buddy in the indie drama Get Low (2009), directed by Aaron Schneider; as Jeep Hanson in the Bible-themed fantasy thriller Legion (2010); and as Luke Chisholm, a talented young golfer set on making the pro tour, in the indie golfing film Seven Days in Utopia (2010).

He portrayed the Brooklyn Dodgers shortstop Pee Wee Reese in the drama film 42 (2013). Black, having done previous sports films and played sports early in his life, found the filming experience "a lot more enjoyable because you get to reminisce about the days when I used to play, and then you get the experience of being on a team again with the actors and have that camaraderie with the players".

In 2014, Black was cast in NCIS: New Orleans as NCIS Special Agent Christopher LaSalle, a no-nonsense agent with a "work hard, play hard" motto.

In 2015, Black returned to play Sean Boswell in a cameo appearance in Furious 7. Sean did not appear in the eighth installment, The Fate of the Furious, and in July 2016, Black explained on The Chris Mannix Show that he could not return due to his schedule with NCIS: New Orleans.

In November 2019, Black left the series NCIS: New Orleans to devote more time to his family.

He also returned to the Fast & Furious franchise, reprising his role as Sean in F9 in 2021.

== Personal life ==
Black married Maggie O'Brien, a lawyer, in 2010. They have three children. He is a registered Republican.

In 2015, he experienced a Christian new birth and became a member of a church.

After he left NCIS: New Orleans in 2019, he began uploading videos to his YouTube channel in January 2020 called "Real Life Lucas Black" with a focus on fishing and hunting.

== Filmography ==
Key
| † | Denotes films that have not yet been released |

=== Film ===
| Year | Title | Role | Notes |
|---|---|---|---|
| 1994 | The War | Ebb Lipnicki | |
| 1996 | Sling Blade | Frank Wheatley | |
| 1996 | Ghosts of Mississippi | Burt DeLaughter | |
| 1996 | Outdoors with T.K. & Mike: Deer Huntin | Himself | Cameo |
| 1998 | The X-Files | Stevie | |
| 1999 | Our Friend, Martin | Randy (voice) | Direct-to-video |
| 1999 | Crazy in Alabama | Peter Joseph "Peejoe" Bullis | |
| 2000 | All the Pretty Horses | Jimmy Blevins | |
| 2003 | Cold Mountain | Oakley | |
| 2004 | Killer Diller | Vernon Jackson | |
| 2004 | Friday Night Lights | Mike Winchell | |
| 2005 | Deepwater | Nat Banyon | |
| 2005 | Jarhead | Lance Corporal Chris Kruger | |
| 2006 | The Fast and the Furious: Tokyo Drift | Sean Boswell | |
| 2009 | Get Low | Buddy Robinson | |
| 2010 | Legion | Jeep Hanson | |
| 2011 | Seven Days in Utopia | Luke Chisholm | |
| 2012 | Promised Land | Paul Geary | |
| 2013 | 42 | Pee Wee Reese | |
| 2015 | Furious 7 | Sean Boswell | Cameo |
| 2021 | F9 | Sean Boswell | |
| 2022 | Legacy Peak | Jason | Pure Flix Original film streaming |
| 2023 | Birthright Outlaw | Rev. Jeremiah Jacobs | Pure Flix Original film streaming |
| 2024 | Unsung Hero | Jed Albright | |

=== Television ===
| Year | Title | Role | Notes |
|---|---|---|---|
| 1995–1996 | American Gothic | Caleb Temple | 22 episodes |
| 1997 | Chicago Hope | Noah Fielding | Episode: "The Son Also Rises" |
| 1997 | Flash | Connor Strong | Television movie |
| 2000 | The Miracle Worker | James Keller | Television movie |
| 2014–2016 | NCIS | Special Agent Christopher "Chris" LaSalle | 4 episodes |
| 2014–2019 | NCIS: New Orleans | Special Agent Christopher "Chris" LaSalle | 125 episodes |
| 2016 | Crockhill Mountain | Caleb McLaughlin | Television movie |

== Awards and nominations ==
| Year | Association | Category | Work | Result |
|---|---|---|---|---|
| 1996 | Screen Actors Guild | Outstanding Performance by a Cast | Sling Blade | Nominated |
| 1997 | Academy of Science Fiction, Fantasy & Horror Films | Best Performance by a Younger Actor | Sling Blade | Won |
| 1997 | Chlotrudis Awards | Best Supporting Actor | Sling Blade | Nominated |
| 1997 | Young Artist Awards | Best Performance in a Feature Film - Leading Young Actor | Sling Blade | Won |
| 1997 | YoungStar Awards | Best Performance by a Young Actor in a Drama Film | Sling Blade | Won |
| 1997 | YoungStar Awards | Best Performance by a Young Actor in a Drama TV Series | American Gothic | Nominated |
| 1998 | Young Artist Awards | Best Performance in a TV Movie/Pilot/Mini-Series – Leading Young Actor | Flash | Nominated |
| 2000 | Young Artist Awards | Best Performance in a Feature Film – Leading Young Actor | Crazy in Alabama | Nominated |
| 2000 | YoungStar Awards | Best Young Actor/Performance in a Motion Picture Drama | Crazy in Alabama | Nominated |
| 2001 | Young Artist Awards | Best Performance in a Feature Film - Supporting Young Actor | All the Pretty Horses | Nominated |
| 2006 | Teen Choice Awards | Choice Movie: Male Breakout Star | The Fast and the Furious: Tokyo Drift | Nominated |
