= Where Trouble Sleeps =

2011 play

Where Trouble Sleeps is a play written by Catherine Bush that takes place in the 1950s on the other side of Travelers Rest, South Carolina about a carjacker who robs Blaine's Store for a hidden treasure chest.

The play is an adaptation of a Clyde Edgerton story.

== Storyline ==
The first part of the play details the carjacker's hits in other cities.
