= Only (magazine) =

Canadian magazine

- Editor: Chuck Ansbacher
- Categories: Entertainment
- Frequency: Bi-monthly
- Publisher: Darren Atwater
- Founded: 2004
- First issue: October 8, 2004
- Final issue: February 2007
- Country: Canada
- Based in: Vancouver, British Columbia
- Website: onlymagazine.ca

Only is a free Canadian bi-monthly news and entertainment magazine published in Vancouver, British Columbia. The magazine is published by the Only Trust, who also organize Vancouver's Music Waste Festival and Victory Square Block Party. The paper has a circulation of 10,000 in the Vancouver area. Its first issue ran on October 8, 2004, and was discontinued in 2010.

== History ==
Only Magazine was founded in 2004 by Darren Atwater after he was fired from Terminal City, the weekly magazine that he had co-founded in 1992. In solidarity, many of the Terminal City staff walked out and formed Only Magazine. In an editorial about the takeover that appeared in the magazine's first issue, Only staff wrote:

We had a dream of a weekly newspaper that covered the real artists and musicians in Vancouver, that made the mainstream newspapers wince every week, and maybe, just maybe, made life free from soulless consumerism a little more realistic for everyone.

Only Magazine primarily covered the fringes of Vancouver's creative communities, but often featured interviews with touring bands such as Deerhoof, Wolf Eyes, Black Dice, and Erase Errata.

In February 2007, after 60 issues, the print magazine was put on hiatus for restructuring. The magazine continued to publish all of its content online. In March 2007, Only Magazine launched its first all-Vancouver music podcast and a widget to count down the days until the supposed 2010 Olympic riot.

Notable contributors include Amil Niazi, who was the magazine's editor from October 2004 to May 2006. The magazine's cover was often designed by Vancouver artists and students from Emily Carr Institute of Art and Design.
