= Deepwater (film) =

- Directed by: David S. Marfield
- Screenplay by: David S. Marfield
- Based on: Deepwater by Matthew F. Jones
- Produced by: Peter Wetherell; Chris Coen
- Starring: Lucas Black; Peter Coyote; Mía Maestro
- Cinematography: Scott Kevan
- Edited by: Eric Strand
- Music by: Charlie Clouser
- Distributed by: Monarch Home Video; Lightning Entertainment
- Release date: June 9, 2005 (Seattle International Film Festival)
- Running time: 93 minutes
- Country: United States
- Language: English

Deepwater is a 2005 American neo-noir film written and directed by David S. Marfield. It is based on Deepwater, a 1999 novel written by Matthew F. Jones. It was screened at the Seattle International Film Festival on June 9, 2005, and the München Fantasy Filmfest in Germany on June 28, 2005. The film was shot in Clearwater and Little Fort in British Columbia, Canada.

== Synopsis ==
Nat Banyon (Lucas Black) is a hitch-hiker whose dream is to open an ostrich farm in Wyoming. Early in the trip, he gets in a fight at a truck-stop bar and in the ruckus, takes his opponent's car keys, stealing his sports car. Continuing the journey, he finds a stranger (Peter Coyote) trapped in an overturned vehicle. He rescues him just as the car is completely destroyed by an incoming truck. Grateful for saving his life, the stranger, Herman Finch, hires Nat as the handyman for his motel. Nat soon learns that Finch runs a criminal network, acting in collusion with the police. Most of the locals are also in league with Finch. And everyone who irritates or opposes him soon turns up missing. They are then found dead.

Finch's young, attractive wife Iris (Mía Maestro) soon hatches a plan to run off with Nat, planning to steal Finch's ill-gotten gains. Soon, Finch begins manipulating Nat when the latter begins questioning him about all the mysterious activities that had been taking place. Finch challenges Nat to a boxing match. If Nat wins, he will be free to leave and take his car as well as the salary that he had made as Finch's handyman.

Nat shows up to the fight after training himself to tip-top shape. When he steps into the ring, Finch suddenly reveals that the fight was a joke. Finch says he doesn't want Nat to leave; Nat had been too good of a worker. Enraged, Nat attacks Finch, and then rushes to the motel. There, he grabs Iris and tells her that they have to leave. Despite her resistance, Nat is too deeply in love with Iris to escape alone. He kidnaps her and speeds away. Unsure of where to go in the night, Nat follows Iris' directions. However, Iris deceives Nat to drive to the barn where he had seen Finch for the fight. In a final fit of frustration, Nat drives off into the water. After pulling the unconscious Iris out of the submerged car and onto shore, Nat is attacked by Finch, and they have a final showdown. Nat loses the fight, and the police arrive to arrest him.

During his flight with Iris it is revealed that Nat is mentally ill, suffering from delusions and hallucinations and possibly multiple personality disorder. This leaves the viewer unsure of how much of the story has been real, and how much has been Nat's imagination. Part of Nat's pathology is an unhealthy attachment to Finch. Although he clearly hates him, he also sees him as a father figure, and his conflicted feelings about his father become entangled with his feeling towards Finch. We come to realize that it is Nat who killed Finch's supposed enemies, to protect his father figure. The film also slowly alludes to the fact that Iris' love for Nat had been Nat's own delusion.

Nat is sent back to a mental hospital where he falls deeper into mental illness, whimpering about the baby ostriches that he would now never have the chance to raise.

== Cast ==
- Lucas Black as Nat Banyon
- Peter Coyote as Herman Finch
- Mía Maestro as Iris
- Lesley Ann Warren as Pam
- Xander Berkeley as Gus
- Jason Cerbone as Sal
- Michael Ironside as "Walnut"
- Kristen Bell as Nurse Laurie
- Ben Cardinal as Petersen
- Dee Snider as The Bartender
- John Boncore as Joe Littlefeet
- Valerie Murphy as Stripper

== Home media ==
The region one DVD was released July 25, 2006.
