= Gustafsen Lake standoff =

1995 indigenous conflict in British Columbia, Canada

- Date: August 18 - September 17, 1995
- Location: Gustafsen Lake, British Columbia, Canada
- Result: Crisis ended

Parties
Protestors, "Tsʼpeten Defenders"	British Columbia: Royal Canadian Mounted Police

The Gustafsen Lake standoff was a land dispute that led to a confrontation between the Royal Canadian Mounted Police (RCMP), Indigenous protestors ("Tsʼpeten Defenders") and non-Indigenous protestors in the interior of British Columbia, Canada, at Gustafsen Lake (known as Tsʼpeten in the Shuswap language).

The standoff began on August 18, 1995, and lasted for 31 days, ending on September 17, when the few remaining protestors left the site peacefully. The RCMP operation during the standoff ended up being the most costly of its kind to date in modern Canadian history, having involved 400 police officers and support from the Canadian Armed Forces in the form of Operation Wallaby.

== Sun Dance and early occupation ==
The 1995 Sun Dance was the sixth Sun Dance to be performed at Gustafsen Lake. Sun Dances began at the site after Faith Keeper Percy Rosette and other Shuswap elders had a vision of the site. The site is located at the head of Dog Creek, near 100 Mile House, British Columbia. The specific location of the lands were in District Lot 114, Lillooet Land District, at approximately 51°32′28.8″N 121°43′0.1″W.

Rosette approached ranch owner Lyle James about conducting the ceremony at Gustafsen Lake. James agreed to allow the ceremony to take place for four years as long as no permanent structures were erected at the site. The Sun Dance continued in 1994 and James discovered that Rosette and his partner Mary Pena had taken up permanent residence at the site sometime late in 1994.

Rosette was in contact with veteran Indigenous rights lawyer and supporter of Indigenous sovereignty, Bruce Allan Clark. On January 3, 1995, Clark submitted a petition to Queen Elizabeth II signed by representatives of Indigenous religious communities from across Canada, including Rosette and Alberta medicine man John Stevens. The petition sought an international inquiry into the subject of the occupation of unceded Indigenous territories by the Canadian government.

At this point, the RCMP operated as mediators between the James Cattle Company and the protestors.

== Growing tension ==
In June 1995, people from the Secwepemc (Shuswap), other Indigenous, and non-Indigenous supporters joined Rosette and Pena at Gustafsen Lake in preparation for the Sun Dance to take place in July. The situation intensified when James presented the camp with an eviction notice after they erected a fence to keep defecating cattle from the ceremonial area. James believed the Indigenous community members and their supporters were staking their territory.

The situation was complicated by allegedly armed and racist ranch hands who impaled the notice on a sacred spear. The Secwepemc believed their religion was under attack. Although guns were already present at the camp, the 1995 Sun Dance leader, Splitting the Sky called for an armed defensive stance. The involvement of local elected Shuswap leadership further aggravated the protestors who saw elected leadership as a functionary of the Canadian state. Initial press releases from the protestors in June and July called Sun Dancers to the site, claimed their right to practise their religion was being violated, and re-asserted the belief that the grounds were part of a larger tract of unceded Indigenous land.

Shots were allegedly fired toward forestry workers working in the area, at which point the RCMP attempted to secure the area.

== Standoff ==
The RCMP continued to negotiate with the protestors through local elected leadership and, then, national Assembly of First Nations (AFN) Grand Chief Ovide Mercredi without success.

The RCMP launched one of the largest police operations in Canadian history, including the deployment of 400 tactical assault team members, five helicopters, two surveillance planes and nine Bison armoured personnel carriers on loan from the Canadian Forces. The RCMP kept journalists well away from the site and some reporters became uneasy that the only side of the story being told was that preferred by the police. Under Canadian law, police forces have discretion to create "exclusion zones" to protect the public, and allow themselves clear space to carry out their duties, but these zones are usually measured in metres.

On September 11, RCMP detonated an explosive device buried in an access road to the camp, heavily damaging a supply truck being driven by protestors. The incident resulted in a firefight that made use of the Bisons. Non-Indigenous occupier Suniva Bronson was shot in the arm during the shootout and would be the only injury in the extensive exchange of bullets. On the following day, an unarmed man crossing a field designated as a no-shoot zone was shot at by police snipers. Police later admitted to this mistake.

The standoff ended peacefully on September 17 when the few remaining protestors left the site under the guidance of medicine man, John Stevens. By the end of the 31-day standoff, police had fired up to 77,000 rounds of ammunition, and killed a dog. One of the Indigenous leaders claimed that at least one of the shooting incidents blamed on them in fact occurred when two Bisons fired on one another when their view was obscured. The operation was the largest paramilitary operation in British Columbia history and cost $5.5 million.

== Resolution ==
Fourteen Indigenous and four non-Indigenous people were charged following the siege, fifteen of whom were found guilty and sentenced to jail terms ranging from six months to eight years. The leader of the protest/occupation, William "Wolverine" Jones Ignace, was found guilty of mischief to property, mischief causing danger to life, possession of firearms and explosives, discharging a firearm at police, and using a firearm to assault police officers. Three of the defendants appealed the verdicts on the grounds that the Canadian courts have no jurisdiction over the lands where the Gustafsen Lake standoff took place, which they claimed remain unceded Indigenous land. The Supreme Court of British Columbia refused to hear the appeal.

One of those convicted was James Pitawanakwat, who was sentenced to three years in jail for endangering life. He left Canada for the United States nine days after being released on parole, and successfully fought extradition to Canada, becoming the only Indigenous person ever granted political asylum in the United States.

According to Magistrate Judge Janice M. Stewart of the U.S District Court in Oregon, "The Gustafsen Lake incident involved an organized group of Indigenous people rising up in their homeland against an occupation by the government of Canada of their sacred and unceded tribal land." She also asserted that "the Canadian government engaged in a smear and disinformation campaign to prevent the media from learning and publicizing the true extent and political nature of these events".

== See also ==
- Burnt Church Crisis
- Caledonia Land Dispute
- Ipperwash Crisis
- Oka Crisis
- Seton Portage Incident
