= Flash (1997 film) =

- VHS cover
- Written by: Monte Merrick
- Directed by: Simon Wincer
- Starring: Lucas Black; Brian Kerwin; Shawn Toovey; Ellen Burstyn
- Music by: Bruce Rowland
- Country of origin: United States
- Original language: English

Production
- Executive producer: Roger Birnbaum
- Producers: Riley Kathryn Ellis; Monte Merrick; Christopher Seitz
- Cinematography: David Burr
- Editor: Corky Ehlers
- Running time: 90 minutes
- Production company: Walt Disney Television

Original release
- Network: ABC
- Release: December 21, 1997

Flash is a 1997 American made-for-television drama film directed by Simon Wincer. It was originally shown on The Wonderful World of Disney on ABC on December 21, 1997.

== Plot ==
The story takes place in Breckenridge, Georgia, where 14-year-old Connor Strong (Lucas Black) becomes deeply attached to a young chestnut colt named Flash, which is up for sale by one of Connor's neighbors. Determined to own the horse, he talks it over with his family, which is composed of his widower father David (Brian Kerwin) and his paternal grandmother Laura (Ellen Burstyn). As the family is struggling financially, Connor is disappointed to learn they don't have the $500 needed to purchase the horse. Connor takes a job at the local grocery store in an attempt to raise the money to buy Flash.

Meanwhile, their continuing pattern of falling behind on their mortgage payments troubles David to the point that he considers taking a job in the merchant marines, a job he'd held several years earlier which yields a $25,000 payout, which includes a $5,000 signing bonus. When discussing this with Laura, he's elated at the prospect of getting ahead in terms of finances, but is dismayed by the thought of being away at sea for five months, remembering a promise he'd made to his late wife that he'd never leave Connor. Despite all this, David takes the job, and with a portion of the signing bonus, buys Flash for Connor.

While Flash and Connor bond instantly, things quickly begin to unravel after David leaves. The signing bonus David had intended to provide for Connor and Laura during his absence is seized by the bank for past due bills, forcing Laura to take a job at the local textile mill. The mill is owned by Alfred Rutherford, Breckenridge's wealthiest resident. While working for the grocery store, Connor delivers groceries to the Rutherford's home, where he meets their son Tad, who is the same age as Connor, and the two quickly become friends. However, the conditions at the mill prove to be detrimental to Laura's health and she suffers a heart attack while on shift, and dies not long afterward. Left on his own, Connor takes on making the arrangements for Laura's funeral, and in his determination to honor the woman who'd raised him since his mother died, he sells Flash to the Rutherfords to give to Tad in order to pay the expenses.

In order to stay near Flash, Connor volunteers to work in the stables for free, and after his house is boarded up by the bank, the Rutherford's groundskeeper gives him a room in the stables. Meanwhile, things for Flash do not go smoothly either. While Tad adores the horse, his father treats Flash very harshly while trying to train him as a racehorse, while at the same time berating Tad for not pushing him hard enough. Upset by this and longing for his father's approval, Tad whips Flash many times, and after calming down he goes to see Flash to apologize. However, Flash responds in a defensive way, injuring Tad. Outraged, Alfred threatens to put Flash down, causing Connor to take Flash and run away.

Labeled as a horse thief and with the sheriff looking for him, Connor's only option is to reach his father, who is scheduled to return in New York in only a few days. Regardless of the time limit, Connor and Flash begin to head north. After four days he makes it to North Carolina, and after winning a horse race at a county fair, he uses the winnings to pay for train tickets for him and Flash, except the money is only enough to get them as far as Trenton, New Jersey. Despite injuring his leg during the train trip, Flash pushes through to get Connor to New York in time, where he catches David immediately after leaving the ship and receiving the rest of his pay.

With the story of Connor and Flash's journey making headlines, they are greeted with a heroes' welcome upon their return to Breckenridge, along with an infuriated Alfred Rutherford, who threatens to have Connor arrested and have Flash put down. Tad, however, stands up to his father, reminding him the horse actually belongs to him, as well as admitting Flash hurting him was his own fault and that Connor was justified in his actions. After calming his father's nerves, Tad gives Flash back to Connor, and alongside his father, Connor takes Flash home.

== Cast ==
- Lucas Black as Connor Strong
- Brian Kerwin as David Strong, Connor's widowed father
- Shawn Toovey as Tad Rutherford
- Tom Nowicki as Alfred Rutherford, Tad's father
- Von Coulter as Floyd
- Ellen Burstyn as Laura Strong, Connor's paternal grandmother
- Wilbur T. Fitzgerald as Mr. Erickson

== Reception ==
Writing in the Orlando Sentinel, critic Hal Boedeker called the film "surprising" and an "excellent family movie" that "stands in the tradition of such classics as National Velvet and The Yearling".

== Awards ==
Lucas Black was nominated for Best Leading Performance in a TV Movie at the 1998 Young Artists Awards.

== Release ==
Though the film was originally shown on The Wonderful World of Disney, repeated reruns of the film have occurred on The Disney Channel.

== See also ==
- List of films about horses
