= Amil Niazi =

Canadian writer, broadcaster and columnist

- Born: 1984 (age 41–42)
- Occupation: Writer
- Spouse: Married
- Children: 3

Amil Niazi is a Canadian writer, broadcaster and columnist, residing in Toronto, Ontario.

Niazi was a long-time section editor at Vancouver's now defunct alternative weekly Terminal City. She went on to co-found the alternative bi-weekly Only. Niazi is also the former co-host of Citytv's Ethnosonic and a regular contributor to CBC Radio 3.

Her freelance work has appeared in Vancouver Magazine, The Westender, Harmony Magazine, Mini Magazine and The Loop.

Her memoir Life After Ambition: A Good Enough Memoir was published in 2026. It builds on her viral essays Losing My Ambition and The Mindfuck of Mid-Life.

She is an associate producer at Canadian Broadcasting Corporation.
