= The Fire Next Time (miniseries) =

- Written by: James S. Henerson
- Directed by: Tom McLoughlin
- Starring: Craig T. Nelson; Bonnie Bedelia; Richard Farnsworth; Justin Whalin; Jürgen Prochnow
- Country of origin: United States
- Original language: English

Production
- Producers: Edwin Self; Robert Halmi Jr. James S. Henerson; Larry Strichman; Gerritt van der Meer
- Running time: 193 minutes

Original release
- Network: CBS
- Release: April 18 – April 20, 1993

The Fire Next Time is a 1993 American television disaster miniseries directed by Tom McLoughlin and written and produced by James S. Henerson which stars Craig T. Nelson, Bonnie Bedelia, Richard Farnsworth and Justin Whalin. The series aired on CBS from April 18 to April 20, 1993. Set in 2017, the plot focuses on a family who, after a series of fires begins to break out due to global warming, must struggle to survive a natural disaster that devastates the Earth.

== Cast ==
- Craig T. Nelson as Drew Morgan
- Bonnie Bedelia as Suzanne Morgan
- Richard Farnsworth as Frank Morgan
- Justin Whalin as Paul Morgan
- Ashley Jones as Linnie Morgan
- Shawn Toovey as Jake Morgan
- Jürgen Prochnow as Larry Richter

== Reception ==
Film critic Rick Sherwood of The Hollywood Reporter wrote in his review: "The Fire Next Time is a small story in a big package, an underworked, underdeveloped and severely underproduced miniseries that might have worked in two hours but fails miserably in four."

== Home media ==
The miniseries became available on DVD on July 21, 2015.
