= John Boncore =

American political activist (1952–2013)

- Dacajeweiah ("Splitting the Sky")
- Born: January 7, 1952; Buffalo, New York
- Died: March 12, 2013 (aged 61); Chase, British Columbia, Canada
- Other names: John Pasquale Boncore, John Boncore Hill, John B. Hill, John Hill
- Occupations: Activist and actor
- Known for: Participation in the Attica Prison revolt, Gustafsen Lake Standoff, and attempted arrest of George W. Bush

John Boncore (January 7, 1952 – March 12, 2013), also known as John Pasquale Boncore, Dacajeweiah ("Splitting the Sky"), John Boncore Hill, John B. Hill, and John Hill, was a political activist and actor who first garnered media attention for his role in the 1971 Attica Prison revolt in upstate New York. In 1975, he was convicted of the murder of prison guard William Quinn during the incident. He was granted clemency by the governor of New York in 1976..

== Personal life ==
Boncore was born in Buffalo, New York, to a Mohawk/Cree mother and an Italian-American father. His father and eleven co-workers died in 1957 after entering a storage tank at U.S. Rubber without respirators. Boncore's family fell into poverty thereafter and he and five siblings were later sent to foster care after being removed from their mother's care. Boncore was physically abused due to being placed in racist households during his time in foster care and ended up homeless after fighting back against one of his oppressive foster parents. He was sent to the juvenile reformatory center in Elmira for robbing a sub shop out of desperation and hunger after sleeping on the streets of New York City. In August 1971, at the age of 19, he was transferred to Attica prison to serve the final months of his sentence. During the subsequent trials, Hill married a woman named Alicia; the couple had a baby boy, John Jr., in 1975.

In 1993, Boncore met Sandra Bruderer, a Cree woman whom he later married, at a First Nations/Native American sovereignty conference in Edmonton. In 2001, the two self-published a co-written autobiography of Boncore entitled The Autobiography of Splitting the Sky: From Attica to Gustafsen Lake (ISBN 0-9689365-0-4). Boncore also acted in roles in the TV series Men In Trees, Alice, I Think and Da Vinci's City Hall, and in the films The Last Rites of Ransom Pride (2010) and Deepwater (2005).

== Attica and political activities ==
Boncore was a leader in the Attica Prison revolt. Although 43 people died during the five-day siege, including ten hostages taken by inmates, Boncore was the only person convicted of murder in the aftermath. Despite a legal defense mounted by famed attorney William Kunstler, Boncore was convicted in 1975 by a jury of the murder of prison guard William Quinn, whom he denied attacking as was claimed, and was sentenced to 20 years to life in prison. However, in 1976, Boncore was granted clemency by New York governor Hugh Carey.

Boncore later joined the American Indian Movement and returned to the media spotlight during the 31-day Gustafsen Lake Standoff by First Nations land claims activists in British Columbia. First Nations people and supporters had come to Gustafsen Lake to hold a Sun Dance on private property there, Boncore was the Sun Dance leader and when an eviction notice was served on the group he called for armed resistance.

In 2009, Boncore was arrested while attempting to make a citizen's arrest of former US president George W. Bush in Calgary, Alberta. He had intended to defend himself on the basis that Bush was a war criminal and that the RCMP was bound by law to assist him rather than arrest him. The judge in the case had scheduled 3 days for him to present his defence (he had asked for one). He died before he was able to present his defence.

== Death ==
On March 13, 2013, Boncore was found dead near his home on the Adams Lake Indian Reserve near Chase, British Columbia. Media reports indicate he is believed to have died on March 12, 2013, after falling on cement steps and possibly suffering a blow to the head. The coroner's office dismissed foul play before a planned autopsy was conducted. Boncore is survived by Sandra Bruderer, six children, and five grandchildren.

== Films ==
- 2005: Deepwater as Joe Littlefeet
- 2005: Mindless Love as Dr. John
- 2005: Da Vinci's City Hall (TV Series) as Rocky
- 2006: Alice, I Think (TV Series)
- 2006: Men in Trees (TV Series)
- 2010: The Last Rites of Ransom Pride as John 'Splitting The Sky' Boncore
