= Shawn Toovey =

American actor (born 1983)

- Born: Shawn Toovey; March 1, 1983 (age 42); Lincoln, Nebraska, U.S.

Shawn Toovey (born March 1, 1983 in Lincoln) is an American actor. He is best known for his role as Brian Cooper in the popular drama Dr. Quinn, Medicine Woman for which Toovey won four Young Artist Awards.

His family moved to San Antonio, Texas, when he was four and ultimately ended up in California, where Shawn spent the next six years playing Brian Cooper on the CBS television series Dr. Quinn, Medicine Woman. He is a founding member of the Children's Board of the Audrey Hepburn Hollywood for Children Foundation. He is also involved in the Juvenile Diabetes Foundation, The Braille Institute, Camp Ronald McDonald, Meals on Wheels and various child abuse preventions organizations.

Toovey played the role of Brian opposite fellow Dr. Quinn actor Orson Bean in the theater production of A Christmas Carol. Toovey has received several awards to date, among them:

- 1994: Youth in Film Award - Best Actor in a Drama Series, 10 and under
- 1994: Spirit of the Prairie Award (from the governor of Nebraska)
- 1996: Young Artist Awards - Best Actor in a Drama Series
- 1996: Michael Landon Award - For: Dr. Quinn, Medicine Woman
- (1993) 1997: Young Artist Awards - Best Actor in a Drama Series.

== Filmography ==
Year	Film	Role	Notes
1991	In Broad Daylight	Claude Rowan	
1991	A Seduction in Travis County	Josh Maguire	
1992	Bed of Lies	Joel Moore	
1992	An American Story	Sam Meadows	
1993	The Fire Next Time	Jake Morgan	
1993	Dr. Quinn, Medicine Woman	Brian Cooper	Appeared in 148 episodes, 1993–1998
1997	Flash	Tad Rutherford	
1999	Dr. Quinn, Medicine Woman: The Movie	Brian Cooper	
2001	Dr. Quinn, Medicine Woman: The Heart Within	Brian Cooper	
