= Queen's Law Journal =

- Discipline: Law
- Language: English
- Edited by: Simran Grewal, Curtis McCullough

Publication details
- Former name: Queen's Intramural Law Journal
- History: 1968–present
- Publisher: Queen's University at Kingston (Canada)
- Frequency: Biannual
- Open access: Yes

Standard abbreviations
- ISO 4: Queen's Law J.

Indexing
- ISSN: 0316-778X
- LCCN: 73641062
- OCLC no.: 819017328

Links
- Journal homepage; Online archive

The Queen's Law Journal is a Canadian peer-reviewed law review. It is published biannually by Queen's University at Kingston.

The journal was established in 1968 as the Queen's Intramural Law Journal, obtaining its current title in 1971, reflecting a change in editorial policy. While it continued to publish student work, the journal began seeking contributions from academics and other members of the legal profession. By the mid-1970s, it had evolved into its present form—a vehicle for scholarship by legal academics, practitioners, and law students. In time, the journal became a fully refereed publication. All submissions that pass the internal review process are subject to a double-blind external assessment by at least two experts in the relevant subject area.
