= Temagami Land Caution =

Territorial dispute in Canada

The Temagami Land Caution was a territorial dispute in the Temagami area of Northeastern Ontario, Canada. In 1877, deputy chief (anike ogima) Ignace Tonené filed a land claim concerning the Temagami region with the Parry Sound federal Indian Agent. The modern land claim was filed with land title offices in August 1973 by Gary Potts, then Chief of the Teme-Augama Anishnabai Indigenous Nation. The caution was intended as a way of maintaining 10,000 km^{2} (3,900 sq mi) of land that they claimed as "n'Daki Menan", meaning "Our Land". Existing throughout much of the 1970s and 1980s, it effectively prevented all types of development on Crown land, such as mining. Crown land sales were also prohibited due to the Temagami Land Caution. In 1988, Vince Kerrio approved the expansion of Red Squirrel Road directly through the Temagami Land Caution. This prompted a series of roadblocks by the Teme-Augama Anishnabai and by environmentalists in 1988–1989. In 1991, the Supreme Court of Canada ruled that the Teme-Augama Anishnabai gave up rights to the land via the 1850 Robinson Treaty despite the Tema-Augama Anishnabai claiming that they never signed or consented to the treaty. The Temagami Land Caution was lifted in 1995 as a result of a court order by the Supreme Court of Canada.
