= Killer Diller (2004 film) =

- Theatrical release poster
- Directed by: Tricia Brock
- Screenplay by: Tricia Brock
- Based on: Killer Diller by Clyde Edgerton
- Produced by: Jason Clark; Cary McNair; Steve Espinosa
- Starring: William Lee Scott; Lucas Black; Niki J. Crawford; John Michael Higgins; Fred Willard
- Cinematography: Matthew Jensen
- Edited by: Tom McArdle
- Music by: Tom Rothrock
- Production company: Sprocketdyne Entertainment
- Distributed by: Freestyle Releasing
- Release dates: March 2004 (SXSW); May 4, 2004 (Tribeca Film Festival); April 28, 2006 (United States)
- Running time: 95 minutes
- Country: United States
- Language: English

Killer Diller is a 2004 American drama film with musical elements that had a limited release in 2006. Produced by Sprocketdyne Entertainment and distributed by Freestyle Releasing, the film was written and directed by Tricia Brock and is based on the novel by Clyde Edgerton. Bottleneck was its working title. It was screened at the South by Southwest Film Festival in March 2004 and the Tribeca Film Festival on May 4, 2004.

== Plot ==
Wesley, (William Lee Scott) a car thief and musician sent to live at a halfway house on the campus of a Christian college meets Vernon, (Lucas Black) an autistic piano player in need of a friend. Together they team up with the struggling halfway house band to create the Killer Diller Blues Band.

== Cast ==
- William Lee Scott as Wesley
- Lucas Black as Vernon Jackson
- Niki J. Crawford as Shanita
- John Michael Higgins as Deermont
- Fred Willard as Ned
- W. Earl Brown as Holister Jackson
- Ashley Johnson as Angie
- Mary Kay Place as Dr. Gwen Bradley
- Taj Mahal as J.R. Cox
- RonReaco Lee as Ben
- Clyde Edgerton as Faculty Member
- Jared Tyler as Raymond

== Awards ==
Tricia Brock won a Crystal Heart Award at the Heartland Film Festival for her work on this film.
