= Clyde Edgerton =

American author (born 1944)

- Born: May 20, 1944 (age 82); Durham, North Carolina, U.S.
- Education: University of North Carolina at Chapel Hill
- Occupations: Author and professor
- Writing career
- Notable awards: North Carolina Award (1997)
- Website: clydeedgerton.com

Clyde Edgerton (born May 20, 1944) is an American author and academic from North Carolina. He has published a dozen books, most of them novels, three of which have been adapted for film. He was a professor at the University of North Carolina Wilmington, where he taught creative writing for 26 years.

== Early life ==
Edgerton was born in Durham, North Carolina on May 20, 1944. His parents were Truma and Ernest Edgerton, who came from families of cotton and tobacco farmers, respectively. He grew up in Bethesda, Durham County, North Carolina was a fundamentalist Baptist. His distant cousin is author Sylvia Wilkerson.

In 1962 Edgerton enrolled at the University of North Carolina at Chapel Hill, eventually graduating in English in 1966. During this time he was a student in the Air Force ROTC program where he learned to fly a small plane. After graduating, he entered the United States Air Force and served five years, from 1966 to 1971, as a fighter pilot in Southeast Asia during the Vietnam War.

After his time in service, Edgerton returned the University of North Carolina at Chapel Hill and graduated with master's degree and Ph.D. in English education. While in graduate school, he taught English at his former high school.

== Career ==
=== Academia ===
Edgerton became a teacher of English education at Campbell University in Buies Creek, North Carolina. Because the college administration was offended by His fictional portrayal of Free Will Baptists in Raney, the novel led to a controversy that resulted in Edgerton's leaving the teaching staff at Campbell University.

Edgerton then taught at St. Andrews Presbyterian College in Laurinburg, North Carolina. Later, he taught and Duke University in Durham, North Carolina and at Millsaps College in Jackson, Mississippi. He became a professor at the University of North Carolina Wilmington in 1998, where he taught creative writing for 26 years before retiring as the Kenan Distinguished Professor in Creative Writing in 2024.

=== Writing ===
Edgerton decided to become a fiction writer on May 14, 1978, after watching Eudora Welty read a short story on public television. He started out writing short stories while teaching at Campbell University.

Edgerton's first novel, Raney, the plot of which revolves around the marriage of a Free Will Baptist and an Episcopalian, was published in 1985. His next novel, Walking Across Egypt, was published in 1987. This was followed by The Floatplane Notebooks in 1988, Killer Diller in 1991, In Memory of Junior in 1992, and Redeye: A Western in 1995. Night Train, was published in 2011 and follows two friends—one White and one Black—in the segregated South of the 1960s.

His novels Raney, Walking Across Egypt, and The Floatplane Notebooks were banned in some schools.

== Awards and honors ==
- Five Notable Books from The New York Times
- Guggenheim Fellowship for Creative Arts
- Lyndhurst Fellowship
- Fellowship of Southern Writers
- Distinguished Alumni Award from the Education Department, University of North Carolina at Chapel Hill
- North Carolina Award for Literature (1997)
- Thomas Wolfe Prize, University of North Carolina at Chapel Hill, 2015
- North Carolina Literary Hall of Fame (2016)
- He has a street named after him in Kernersville, North Carolina
- Honorary doctorate, University of North Carolina at Asheville
- Honorary doctorate, St. Andrews Presbyterian College

== Personal life ==
In the later 1970s and 1980s, Edgerton lived in Apex, North Carolina. He purchased a 1946 Piper Super Cruiser that he named "Annabelle" in 1989. He crashed the airplane in January 1991.

Edgerton is married and lives with his wife and their children in Wilmington, North Carolina. He served as the chair of the Arts Council in Wilmington, North Carolina. He is also a singer and songwriter. He plays the guitar, banjo, and piano.

== Selected works ==
=== Novels ===
- Raney (Algonquin Books, 1985)
- Walking Across Egypt (1987)
- The Floatplane Notebooks (1988)
- Killer Diller (1991)
- In Memory of Junior (1992)
- Redeye (1995)
- Where Trouble Sleeps (1997)
- Lunch at the Piccadilly (2003)
- The Bible Salesman (2008)
- The Night Train (2011)

=== Nonfiction and memoir ===
- Solo: My Adventure in the Air (2005; non-fiction memoir of his fighter pilot career)
- Papadaddy's Book for New Fathers: Advice to Dads of All Ages (2013)

=== Short stories ===
- "Changing Names". New Stories from the South: The Year's Best, 1990 (Algonquin Books)

== Adaptations ==
Three of Edgerton's novels have been adapted to film:

- Raney (1997)
- Walking Across Egypt (1999)
- Killer Diller (2004), in which Edgerton had a cameo as a faculty member.

One of Edgerton's novels was adapted into a play:

- Where Trouble Sleeps, a Catherine Bush play adaptation
