= Terminal City (magazine) =

Canadian magazine

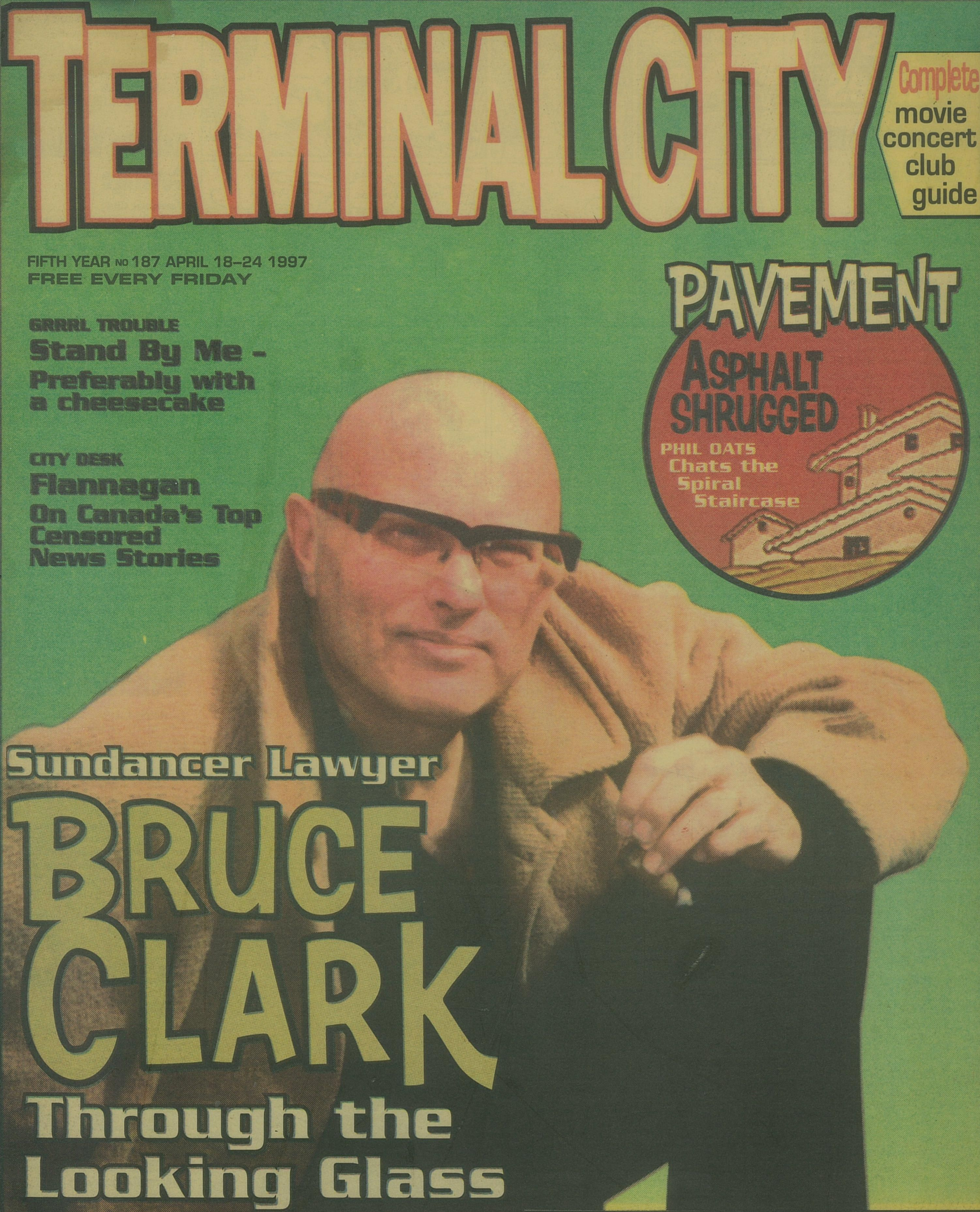
- Cover of the 18 April 1997 issue, featuring Indigenous rights lawyer Bruce Allan Clark
- Type: Weekly magazine
- Founder(s): Darren Atwater, Dave Holden, Josephine Ochej
- Publisher: Victory Square Publishing Ltd.
- Founded: 1992
- Ceased publication: October 2005
- Language: English
- Headquarters: Vancouver, British Columbia

Terminal City was an independent weekly magazine published in Vancouver, British Columbia.

== History ==
Terminal City was founded in 1992 by Darren Atwater and Dave Holden as a successor to AF Magazine. It began as an "every-other weekly", with initial circulation in Vancouver and Bellingham, and occasionally in Whistler and Seattle. Later, the magazine was distributed in the Vancouver and Bellingham areas during the 1990s. The publication often struggled due to difficulties distributing new issues on time and inconsistent advertising revenue.

Terminal City magazine contained articles and event listings, often spotlighting local music subculture or local fashion, critical reviews, local art, and local or international politics. Throughout the years, the magazine also featured Dan Savage's "Savage Love" column, as well as comics by Tony Millionaire and Ian Boothby. In its later years, a prominent columnist was Amil Niazi. The magazine's logo was designed by Pete Fry, who contributed graphics for the publication for a large portion of its existence. The first issue featured an interview of comedian Bruce McCulloch from Kids in the Hall.

In 1994, the magazine published an article by columnist Brian Salmi titled "Booze Up and Riot", in which he predicted the forthcoming 1994 Stanley Cup Riot. As a result, the Vancouver Police Department investigated Salmi and Terminal City for their role in instigating the riot, but no charges were laid. In 1996, Salmi and Terminal City encouraged people off the street to run for Mayor of Vancouver, with a goal of 100 candidates—the campaign resulted in 58 names on the ballot. In future elections the fee requirement for city mayoral election was raised and applications had to be submitted in person rather than by fax.

In 1994, Terminal City received national attention when the paper published a centrefold "pin the leg on the separatist" campaign, and ran a competition at the Niagara Pub. The campaign was mocking Quebec Separatist leader Lucien Bouchard, who had lost his leg to a flesh-eating bacteria.

In 1998, the magazine ceased operations due to bankruptcy; it was revived in 2001. In 2004, Terminal City was taken over by former NDP aide John Kay, who acquired a majority stake in the magazine's publisher, Victory Square Publishing Ltd. In October of that year, unresolvable differences between the paper's staff and its new management led to Atwater being fired; in response, several other employees walked out and formed Only Magazine. Following the dispute, Terminal City was published by John Kay and edited by Bess Lovejoy. Writers Chris Eng, Adam Harrison, Aaron Peck, and Heather Watson also remained at the magazine.

On 31 October 2005, Terminal City announced its closure. The final edition was edited by Ian King and featured the work of local artist Ehren Salazar on the cover.
