= A Single Shot =

- Theatrical release poster
- Directed by: David M. Rosenthal
- Screenplay by: Matthew F. Jones
- Based on: A Single Shot by Matthew F. Jones
- Produced by: Aaron L. Gilbert; Chris Coen; Jeff Rice; Keith Kjarval
- Starring: Sam Rockwell; Jeffrey Wright; Kelly Reilly; Jason Isaacs; Joe Anderson; Ophelia Lovibond; Ted Levine; William H. Macy
- Cinematography: Eduard Grau
- Edited by: Dan Robinson
- Music by: Atli Örvarsson
- Production companies: A Single Shot Productions; Bron Studios; Demarest Films; Media House Capital; Unanimous Pictures; Unified Pictures
- Distributed by: Tribeca Film
- Release dates: February 13, 2013 (Berlinale); September 20, 2013 (United States)
- Running time: 112 minutes
- Country: United States
- Language: English
- Box office: $18,642

A Single Shot is a 2013 American independent Southern noir crime thriller film directed by David M. Rosenthal and written by Matthew F. Jones, based on his own 2011 novel of the same name. It stars Sam Rockwell, William H. Macy, Ted Levine, Kelly Reilly and Jason Isaacs.

== Plot ==
John Moon's wife recently took their son and left. Before John's father died, he was unable to pay the mortgage on the family farm, and it was foreclosed and sold. John is depressed and an emotional wreck. He lives in poverty in rural West Virginia, feeding himself by hunting deer. While illegally stalking a deer with a shotgun on Nature Conservancy land, he accidentally shoots and kills a young woman. He then finds a box containing $100,000 in the abandoned van where she was hiding. He hides the woman's body in a shipping container.

During the following days, he attempts to reconcile with his wife. He contacts a local attorney to try to negotiate for his wife and son's return home and leaves the attorney several hundred dollar bills, drawing the attorneys' attention and suspicion. John visits his son at his wife's apartment and interrupts the babysitter having sex with a recently released convict who has returned home. As he leaves, he is threatened by a stranger who resents his glance.

John returns to his trailer and finds that someone has trashed it, apparently looking for the money. The dead girl's body is on his bed with a note. His wife shows up and wants to come inside and get her clothing, but John refuses. Later, while he is in his trailer, someone shoots and kills his dog. In another incident a rock wrapped in a note threatening his family is thrown through the trailer window. John suspects the ex-con is responsible for these events. He enters the ex-con's motel room and is interrupted by the ex-con's return. He hides in the louvered closet. The stranger from outside the diner arrives at the hotel room and asks the ex-con if he's "gotten the money back". The ex-con tells him that the woman who had the money has died and the stranger is furious. John sees him slit the ex-con's throat. The ex-con falls into the closet and sees John, but is unable to talk before he dies. John manages to avoid detection until the stranger leaves the hotel room. As John is leaving the hotel room, the phone rings. John picks up to hear the lawyer tell the ex-con that he needs to deal with John. John visits the attorney and threatens him with a pistol, trying to force him to reveal what he knows. All he learns is that his wife was concerned about where John got the money and wants to talk to him.

A friendly local girl brings John something to eat, and while they are eating outside, the radio in the trailer starts playing loudly. John goes inside to investigate, carrying a pistol. He hears the girl scream outside, and returns to find her held captive by the stranger. John is forced to discard his pistol and knife. The stranger asks John where the money is. John says he buried it nearby. The stranger tells him to go get it, but first cuts off John's right index finger and thumb, to be sure he can't use a weapon. John goes to his truck and gets a scoped rifle. Despite his wounds, he successfully kills the stranger. He takes the girl to town and returns to the trailer and a shed outside, which contains a freezer in which he has hidden the dead woman's body. He drags her body up the hill and digs a hole to bury her. Weakened by loss of blood, he's unable to get out of the hole. He pulls the girl′s body into the hole with him and looks up to see a deer looking down at him from the edge of the hole.

== Cast ==
- Sam Rockwell as John Moon
- Jeffrey Wright as Simon, John's friend
- Kelly Reilly as Jess, a waitress and John's estranged wife
- Jason Isaacs as Waylon, a drug dealer
- Joe Anderson as Obadiah, an ex-con and coworker of Simon
- Ophelia Lovibond as Abbie, Cecil's daughter
- Ted Levine as Cecil, a farmer who operates John's family farm
- William H. Macy as Pitt, a lawyer
- Amy Sloan as Carla, Jess's coworker at Puffy's
- William Earl Brown as Puffy, the owner of the diner Jess works at
- Heather Lind as Mincy, Simon's cousin
- Christie Burke as Ingrid, the victim and Waylon's girlfriend
- Jenica Bergere as Colette, Simon's girlfriend
- Lana Giacose as Angela

== Production ==
Filming began in February 2012 in Vancouver, British Columbia. The film was released on September 20, 2013, and distributed in the United States by Tribeca Film.

== Reception ==
A Single Shot received mixed reviews from critics. On the review aggregator website Rotten Tomatoes, 45% of 53 critics' reviews are positive, with an average rating of 5.6/10. The website's consensus reads: "It has a bleak sense of atmosphere and a terrific performance by Sam Rockwell, but A Single Shot is undercut by its predictable story and slow pace." Metacritic, which uses a weighted average, assigned the film a score of 53 out of 100, based on 16 critics, indicating "mixed or average" reviews.

== Soundtrack ==
The music for A Single Shot was written by Icelandic-born composer Atli Örvarsson whose music is strongly rooted in 20th century modernism. The score was recorded with the London Metropolitan Orchestra. The soundtrack has been released digitally and on CD by MovieScore Media / Kronos Records. One of the special things about the soundtrack is that the shorter cues have been organized into movements, thus creating a program that sounds very much like a concert piece.

All music is composed by Atli Örvarsson.

A Single Shot: Original Soundtrack
No.	Title	Length
1.	"A Single Shot"	1:06
2.	"Opening"	3:20
3.	"Remembering"	4:20
4.	"The John Moon Variations: Movement 1 – The Shot"	7:00
5.	"The John Moon Variations: Movement 2 – Late Night Call"	8:30
6.	"The John Moon Variations: Movement 3 – Showdown"	9:45
7.	"Finale"	8:26
Total length:		42:27
