= The Chris Mannix Show =

- Genre: Sports
- Running time: 3 hours
- Hosted by: Chris Mannix
- Website: NBC Sports Radio

The Chris Mannix Show was a weekly sports radio program that was hosted by Chris Mannix. The program was broadcast on NBC Sports Radio on Sundays from 6:00 pm to 9:00 pm ET. It premiered on Sunday, January 6, 2013. It ended on February 2, 2018. The Afternoon Drive slot on NBC Sports Radio was replaced by Calling the Shots with Keith Irizarry.
