= Producciones Sin Un Duro =

Producciones Sin Un Duro is a Spanish film production company created in Madrid in 2003, that aims to alternate between fiction and documentary films, with the main emphasis on cinema with social content, low budget and global audiences, using austere production designs.

Producciones Sin Un Duro has produced the full-length documentary Estrellas de la Línea (The Railroad All Stars), which took part in the Panorama section of the Berlinale ([Second Audience Award, Berlinale Panorama 2006 ]; Jury Special Mention, Málaga Film Festival 2006(in Spanish); Sebastián Prize, San Sebastián Film Festival 2006; Audience Award, LAFF Utrecht 2007, as well as a dozen other awards at international film festivals). The film has participated in the official section of diverse festivals around the world: Karlovy Vary, Hot docs-Toronto, Silver Docs-Washington, Montreal, Edinburgh, Warsaw, Hamburg, Chicago, Miami or Tokio. The company's filmography also includes the documentary short films Amor callejero (Street Love) and Triste Borracha (Sad Drunk; Jury First Prize, Documenta Madrid 2009), and the full-length documentary El Abrazo de los Peces (2011) (The Embrace of the Fishes).

The company's most recent project is Nightfall in India (2014), a feature fiction film that is an international co-production, directed by Chema Rodríguez. It participated at Málaga Film Festival 2014, and got the awards for Best Actor and Best Editing.
