= Jon Schroder =

American filmmaker (born 1973)

Jon Schroder (born 1973) is an American filmmaker. He began his career in New York City, writing for a myriad of television shows, cable networks, production companies, and independent film producers. Schroder is one of the co-creators and producers of Nat Geo Wild's The Incredible Dr. Pol.

Schroder went on to direct a series of short films, commercials, documentaries, and reality shows for Spike TV, Nickelodeon, MTV, and Comedy Central. In addition to writing and directing, Schroder worked in various crew positions on the televisions shows, The Sopranos, Law & Order, and Sex and the City as well as for the films Spider-Man (2002), Kissing Jessica Stein (2001), and 3 A.M. (2001).

Schroder co-wrote, produced, and directed the feature film Jimmy and Judy (2006), starring Edward Furlong and Rachael Bella. The film earned two Best Feature Awards at the Newport Beach International Film Festival and the San Francisco Independent Film Festival.
