= Gimme the Power =

Gimme the Power may refer to:

- Gimme the Power (2000 film), a Mexican crime film
- Gimme the Power (2012 film), a Mexican documentary film
- "Gimme tha Power", a song by Molotov from ¿Dónde Jugarán las Niñas?
