= Latin American Film Festival =

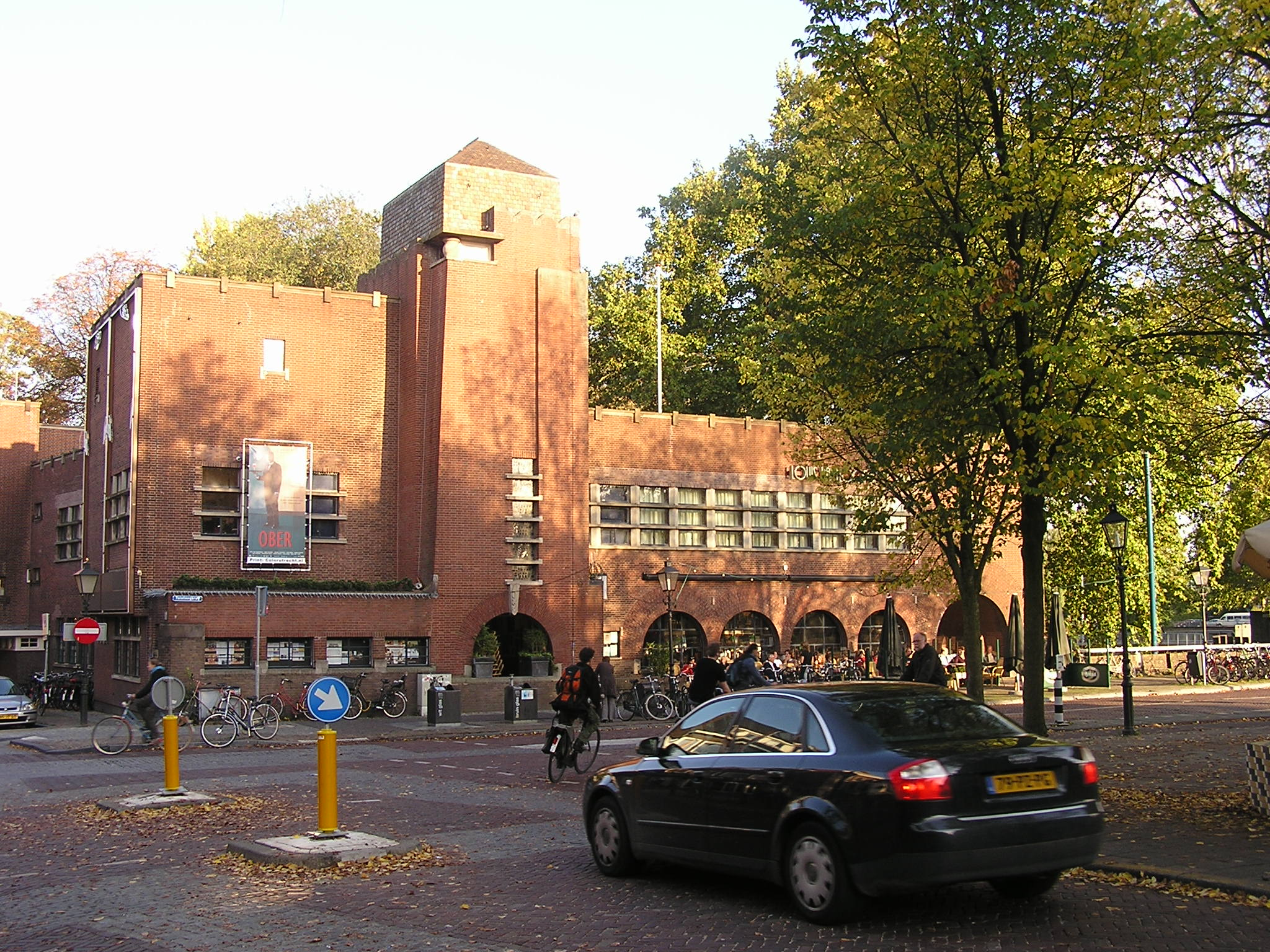
The Latin American Film Festival is held in the Louis Hartlooper Complex in the city of Utrecht.

The Latin American Film Festival (LAFF) was a film festival dedicated to Latin American cinema, held annually in the city of Utrecht, Netherlands, from 2005 to 2013.

== Awards and winners ==
=== Latin Angel Jury Award ===
The top prize of the Festival was awarded since 2005 by a professional jury to the best film in the competition. The prize has been awarded to:

- 2013: Beauty – Daniela Seggiario
- 2012: La Demora – Rodrigo Plá
- 2011: Post mortem – Pablo Larraín
- 2010: Norteado - Rigoberto Perezcano
- 2009: La rabia - Albertina Carri
- 2008: Las niñas – Rodrigo Marín
- 2007: Madrigal – Fernando Perez
- 2006: En la cama – Matías Bize
- 2005: El Viaje hacia el Mar – Guillermo Casanova

=== Hivos Latin Angel Audience Award Feature ===
This special prize in the category "Feature films" has been awarded since 2007 to the following winners.

- 2013: Infancia clandestina - Benjamín Ávila
- 2012: Un cuento chino - Sebastián Borensztein
- 2011: También la Lluvia - Icíar Bollaín
- 2010: Contracorriente - Javier Fuentes León
- 2009: Última Parada 174 - Bruno Barreto
- 2008: Tropa de Elite - José Padilha
- 2007: Proibido Proibir - Jorge Durán

=== Hivos Latin Angel Audience Award Documentary ===
This special prize in the category "Documentary films" has been awarded since 2007 to the following winners.

- 2013: Gimme the Power - Olallo Rubio
- 2012: Senna - Asif Kapadia
- 2011: Boys of Summer - Keith Aumont
- 2010: Hijos de Cuba - Andrew Lang
- 2009: Coyote - Chema Rodríguez
- 2008: Circunstancias Especiales - Héctor Salgado
- 2007: Las Estrellas de la Línea - Chema Rodríguez
