= List of Promised Land episodes =

Promised Land is an American drama series which aired on CBS from 1996 to 1999. It is a spin-off from another series, Touched by an Angel. During the course of the series, 68 episodes of Promised Land aired over three seasons.

== Series overview ==
Season	Episodes	Originally released	
Season	Episodes	First released	Last released
1	24	September 17, 1996	May 20, 1997
2	23	September 25, 1997	May 14, 1998
3	22	October 1, 1998	May 20, 1999

== Episodes ==
=== Backdoor pilot (1996) ===
The first episode of the third season of Touched by an Angel, entitled "Promised Land", serves as a backdoor pilot for Promised Land.

Title	Directed by	Written by	Original release date
"Promised Land"	Michael Schultz	Martha Williamson	September 15, 1996
Suddenly without a job, Russell Greene (Gerald McRaney) takes his family -- his wife Claire (Wendy Phillips), son Josh (Austin O'Brien), his daughter Dinah (Sarah Schaub), his mother Hattie (Celeste Holm), and his nephew, Nathaniel (Eddie Karr) -- and hits the road across the country to Chicory Creek, his mother's small hometown in the state of Kentucky. Russell was promised work there, only to discover the man who offered employment has died. Family friend Erasmus Jones (Ossie Davis) offers his land on which they can park their trailer, until things get better for them. Russell's nine-year-old nephew Nathaniel is also staying with Erasmus, after Russell's brother Joe has left town. Russell is talked into traveling by bus to New York, in order to persuade Erasmus' daughter (Suzzanne Douglas) to open up a clinic in the town that helped her get into medical school. Russell receives help getting back to town from fellow bus passenger Tess (Della Reese), who later reveals herself to be an angel. She tells him that God wants his family to travel around America and help others.

=== Season 1 (1996–97) ===
No. overall	No. in season	Title	Directed by	Written by	Original release date	Prod. code
1	1	"The Expatriate"	Victor Lobl	E.F. Wallengren & Valerie Woods	September 17, 1996	103
While the Greenes travel through Colorado, they hear a radio broadcast of a high-school basketball coach (Michael Gross) announcing that he is moving to New Zealand. He has become disillusioned with America and the Greenes must restore his faith.
2	2	"The Prodigy"	Gene Reynolds	Deborah Starr Seibel	September 24, 1996	104
The Greenes attend a music festival in Evanston, Wyoming, honoring a late rock legend. They meet his grieving wife Pamela Riley (Gail O'Grady), who fears that her son Trevor (Benjamin Salisbury) will follow his father's destructive career path. 70's Rock legend Joe Walsh guest-stars.
3	3	"The Motel"	Victor Lobl	E.F. Wallengren	October 1, 1996	101
While passing through Arkansas, the Greenes discover that Joe left a run-down motel without paying his bill, so Russell decides to work off the debt by making repairs for the embittered motel owner (Marion Ross).
4	4	"The Hostage"	Victor Lobl	William A. Schwartz	October 8, 1996	105
Claire's great Aunt Ethel (Cloris Leachman) is celebrating her 100th birthday in Pueblo, Colorado. However, Russell must encourage a man (David Graf) to take action against his employer for dumping toxic waste at a local landfill site, which ultimately led to his wife's death from cancer.
5	5	"The Magic Gate"	Burt Brinckerhoff	E.F. Wallengren & R.J. Colleary	October 15, 1996	106
While visiting a small town in West Virginia, Russell intervenes when he discovers Nathaniel's favorite author (Valerie Harper) is a morphine addict and that her fellow townspeople refuse any assistance because of the bad reputation it would give the town.
6	6	"Leap of Faith"	Michael Schultz	E.F. Wallengren & Martha Williamson & Norman Morrill	October 29, 1996	102
Dinah's navigating lands the Greenes in Roswell, New Mexico. They encounter a group of UFO believers eagerly awaiting the return of a former astronaut (James Brolin) who disappeared years ago. Russell learns the secret of the disappearance.
7	7	"Little Girl Lost"	Vincent McEveety	Norman Morrill & Valerie Woods	November 12, 1996	107
The Greene family's camping in the Great Smoky Mountains of North Carolina is interrupted when a young girl (Laura Morgan) becomes lost. Dinah uses her mapping and trail skills to locate the child, which impresses Russell.
8	8	"The Secret"	Gene Reynolds	William Schmidt	November 19, 1996	108
Claire takes a job as a substitute teacher at a high school in Pennsylvania. She and Josh must help a troubled teenaged girl (Julia Stiles), who is afraid to tell her father (Lee Majors) that she has suffered a miscarriage. Claire and Russell empathize with the girl as they recall a similar loss of their own years ago.
9	9	"Homecoming: Part 2"	Tim Van Patten	William A. Schwartz & E.F. Wallengren	November 26, 1996	109
The Greenes return to Chicory Creek, Kentucky, to join Erasmus for Thanksgiving, but Nathaniel's mother (Delta Burke) arrives, intent on reclaiming her son, now that her life is in order. Note: This episode begins on Touched by an Angel.
10	10	"King of the Road"	Jim Johnston	Danna Doyle & Debbie Smith	December 3, 1996	110
A charismatic older gentleman (Steve Forrest) woos a surprised Hattie. Meanwhile, the Greenes run into con artists when they go shopping for a new trailer, after a fire destroys their old one.
11	11	"Christmas"	Michael Ray Rhodes	E.F. Wallengren	December 17, 1996	111
Claire goes home for Christmas after receiving a letter from her favorite grade-school teacher (James T. Callahan) who is dying. She discovers that her mother (Mary Elizabeth McDonough) had a past romantic tryst with him.
12	12	"The Getaway"	Stuart Margolin	William Schmidt & William A. Schwartz	January 7, 1997	112
On their way to Cheyenne, Colorado, the Greenes stop to help Ellen Boller (Wendel Meldrum), whose car has broken down on the road. Russell and Claire learn that Ellen and her daughter (Kelsey Mulrooney) are running away from an abusive husband (John Finn), who happens to be the town sheriff. Russell's attempt to rescue the woman and her daughter puts his own family in jeopardy, but eventually he is able to defuse the tense situation.
13	13	"Independence Day"	Burt Brinckerhoff	Debbie Smith & Danna Doyle	January 14, 1997	113
The Greenes visit relatives in Great Falls, Montana, who are struggling with the demands of caring for a new baby and their adult brother Bob (Chris Burke) who has Down syndrome.
14	14	"Mirror Image"	Stuart Margolin	William A. Schwartz & Deborah Starr Seibel	January 21, 1997	114
Claire fears the worst when she discovers a lump in her right breast and secretly goes to a hospital for a mammogram. There, she befriends Rachel (Essence Atkins), who is facing a cancer diagnosis and mastectomy. Scared, Rachel tells Claire that she is breaking off her engagement with fiancé David (Derek Webster). Claire must undergo a biopsy which alarms her family, but the biopsy comes back negative. Russell and Claire renew their vows, which convinces Rachel and David to marry.
15	15	"The Collapse"	Jim Johnston	Teleplay by : William A. Schwartz & E.F. Wallengren; Story by : Jim Johnston and William A. Schwartz and E.F. Wallengren	February 11, 1997	116
Russell works day labor in a mine. Fighting to stay on top of their orders to meet deadlines, and low on manpower, his coworkers are pushed to their limits when a support beam gives way, causing the mine to collapse. Russell and twelve others are trapped. He struggles to keep the crew in the right frame of mind to handle the situation. While struggling himself, Russell is visited by his deceased father (R. Lee Ermey), which gives them a chance to take care of some unfinished business. Finally, rescue teams break through to the other side. The weary miners emerge singing the inspirational song "Swing Low, Sweet Chariot".
16	16	"Running Scared"	Burt Brinckerhoff	Michael Glassberg	February 18, 1997	115
Hattie and Dinah come across 15-year-old Allison (Thora Birch) shivering in the cold and take her in. The girl is a runaway from a foster home and confides that she is searching for her older brother Tommy, whom she hasn't seen in eight years. Russell and Allison learn that Tommy had committed suicide by jumping off a railroad bridge. Distraught at the news of Tommy's death, Allison attempts to end her own life and Russell and the Greenes are able to save her.
17	17	"Amazing Grace: Part 2"	Victor Lobl	Martha Williamson, E.F. Wallengren and William A. Schwartz	February 25, 1997	318B
The Greene family joins Josh on an assignment after a violent gang incident. Note: This episode begins on Touched by an Angel.
18	18	"Downsized"	Michael Schultz	William Schmidt	March 4, 1997	117
After a recent shooting blinds Josh, the Greenes go to Post Falls, Idaho to place him in a special institute. They then visit Ned Bernhart (Stacy Keach), a friend from North Carolina. Ned sets Russell up with a job interview at his place of employment, but a younger, less qualified applicant is hired and Ned loses his job. Russell convinces Ned to consult with a lawyer about an age discrimination lawsuit. Meanwhile, Hattie arranges a protest, complete with local news crews, against Ned's employer. His lawyer and Russell are able to broker a deal to return Ned to his job.
19	19	"The Outrage"	Michael Ray Rhodes	Claire Whitaker	March 18, 1997	119
Russell tries to prevent Jesse (Wes Studi), a Native American friend, from avenging the death of a young man killed during a dispute to keep a coal company off a reservation. Meanwhile, Josh meets Jesse's son Will (Demetrius Navarro), who helps him adjust to his recent blindness.
20	20	"Intolerance"	Victor Lobl	E.F. Wallengren	April 5, 1997	120
With the help of Russell and Claire, a woman (Rue McClanahan) forces a young boy (Dylan Bruno) to face his anti-Semitic acts by telling him about her own family's Jewish past.
21	21	"Cowboy Blues"	Alan J. Levi	William A. Schwartz	April 29, 1997	121
The Greenes take a detour to a ranch and find a father (David Selby) and son (Nick Stahl) at odds over what to do with a traumatized horse.
22	22	"Civil Wars"	Larry Lipton	Danna Doyle & Debbie Smith	May 6, 1997	122
Dinah sees the angel of death (John Dye) and fears that a loved one is going to die. Then the Greenes are involved in a car accident that leaves a woman seriously injured.
23	23	"Stealing Home: Part 1"	Burt Brinckerhoff	William A. Schwartz & E.F. Wallengren	May 13, 1997	123
Nathaniel fights a Little League teammate who teases him about the coach's (Sharon Gless) crush on Russell. The fight, along with Russell's rebuffing the coach's advances, sparks a complaint to social services and raises questions about the Greenes' parental abilities.
24	24	"Stealing Home: Part 2"	Burt Brinckerhoff	William A. Schwartz & E.F. Wallengren	May 20, 1997	124
The coach who accused the Greenes of child negligence faces the same charge, when her own son (Andrew J. Ferchland) runs away from home with Nathaniel, saying he blames her for the death of his twin brother.

=== Season 2 (1997–98) ===
No. overall	No. in season	Title	Directed by	Written by	Original release date	Prod. code
25	1	"The Road Home: Part 2"	Burt Brinckerhoff	William A. Schwartz & Claire Whitaker	September 25, 1997	203
Russell tries to get Nathaniel back from the boy's prodigal father—his brother Joe (Richard Thomas), which includes telling the police about Joe's car accident while under the influence of drugs. Note: This episode begins on Touched by an Angel.
26	2	"The Promise"	Michael Schultz	Claire Whitaker & Rolf Wallengren	October 2, 1997	201
Claire skips an event held to honor Russell's grandfather in order to keep a promise she made 25 years before to her ex-boyfriend Rod (Douglas Sheehan).
27	3	"Par for the Course"	Vincent McEveety	William A. Schwartz	October 9, 1997	202
When Nathaniel leaves Hattie's embroidered travel map in a gift shop, he, Hattie, Dinah and Josh return for it and find the proprietor (Stephen Tobolowsky) has claimed it as his own. Meanwhile, Claire shares some unsettling news with Russell that will impact all members of the family.
28	4	"Crushed"	Gene Reynolds	Debra Epstein	October 16, 1997	204
Josh refuses to have sex with his new girlfriend Meredith (Meredith Monroe), causing her to feel rejected. Meanwhile, a pregnant Claire battles morning sickness.
29	5	"Mooster's Revenge"	Jim Johnston	William A. Schwartz	October 23, 1997	205
When Russell sells the piano owned by Claire's great-aunt Ethel (Cloris Leachman), he bears witness to a bitter family feud.
30	6	"Saint Russell"	Burt Brinckerhoff	Deborah Starr Seibel	October 30, 1997	206
Russell becomes the object of hero worship when he rescues a drowning girl, which convinces a cancer victim (Anne Lockhart) that he is a miracle worker.
31	7	"Take Back the Night"	Jim Johnston	Claire Whitaker	November 6, 1997	207
Dinah is a victim of attempted rape on her way home from her job at a hospital, where she is befriended by Dr. Smith (Jameson Parker), who may not be as nice as he appears.
32	8	"Mr. Muscles"	Vincent McEveety	William A. Schwartz	November 13, 1997	208
Russell must persuade a former high-school basketball teammate (Robert Hays) to keep his star-athlete son Ryan (Zachery Ty Bryan) from taking steroids.
33	9	"The Winter"	Terrence O'Hara	Debra Epstein	November 20, 1997	209
Russell learns that his new boss (Brian McNamara) owes money to loan sharks who are not afraid to stake out the work site.
34	10	"To Everything a Season"	Gene Reynolds	Mimi Schmir	November 27, 1997	210
A Thanksgiving visit with Claire's sister (Kate McNeil) and her husband (Michael Reilly Burke) is cut short after Claire announces her unexpected pregnancy and the childless couple takes the news badly.
35	11	"The Bookworm"	Sandor Stern	Deborah Starr Seibel	December 11, 1997	211
Claire discovers that a popular high school student (Trever O'Brien) is illiterate, as is his uncaring father (Asher Metchik), whose remedy is to have his son quit school and learn a trade.
36	12	"Recycled"	Terrence O'Hara	Danna Doyle & Debbie Smith	January 8, 1998	212
Hattie visits her ailing friend Evelyn (Elizabeth Wilson) who begs Hattie to help end her life. Meanwhile, Claire develops pregnancy complications.
37	13	"Mirror Family"	Stuart Margolin	Edmond Stevens	January 15, 1998	213
The Greenes befriend Brad (Ted Shackelford) and Linda Elias (Teddi Siddall), whose family seems to mirror the Greene lifestyle of home schooling and traveling around the country. Upon closer inspection, Russell realizes that they are not what they seem and like the nomad lifestyle for a secret reason.
38	14	"Purple Heart"	Alan J. Levi	Debra Epstein	January 29, 1998	214
The discovery of a seemingly valuable Purple Heart medal at a flea market has Nathaniel searching out its owner, but he is surprised to learn that it was given away by a troubled woman (Kaitlin Hopkins) whose father won it in the war.
39	15	"Designated Driver"	Stuart Margolin	Mimi Schmir	February 5, 1998	215
The Greenes return to Chicory Creek and Josh becomes smitten with a teenage girl (Selma Blair) who is secretly an alcoholic. Meanwhile, Russell helps Claire with a teaching assignment in auto shop.
40	16	"Two for the Road"	Alan J. Levi	E.F. Wallengren & William A. Schwartz	February 26, 1998	216
Joe (Richard Thomas) is released from jail on a weekend pass to surprise his son Nathaniel for his birthday, but he and brother Russell run into some rough weather on the way home.
41	17	"The Secret of Bluestem"	Sandor Stern	Claire Whitaker	March 5, 1998	217
A relative of Claire's leaves her a 100-acre ranch in South Dakota, but the family soon becomes involved in a dispute over an Indian burial site.
42	18	"Undercover Granny"	Tim Van Patten	Arnold Margolin	March 26, 1998	218
Josh sees a distressed resident at a nursing home, so Hattie poses as a tenant to find out if the facility is abusing its residents.
43	19	"On My Honor"	Stuart Margolin	Story by : Steve Gottfried & Edmond Stevens; Teleplay by : Edmond Stevens	April 2, 1998	219
When Claire suspects the principal (John Terry) at her latest school is illegally boosting student test scores, she risks her longtime friendship with his wife (Hallie Foote) to learn the truth. Meanwhile, Nathaniel resorts to cheating to get a Cub Scout badge.
44	20	"Total Security"	Robert Visciglia, Jr.	Deborah Starr Seibel	April 23, 1998	221
Working as a mall security guard, Russell helps his new his boss (Gary Graham), whose supposedly deceased wife (Pam Tillis) returns to see their daughter (Elise Shirley) after disappearing years before. Note: This episode begins a crossover story that concludes on Diagnosis: Murder "Promises to Keep".
45	21	"When Darkness Falls"	Tim Van Patten	Mimi Schmir	April 30, 1998	220
After a disturbed teen (Kaj-Erik Eriksen) opens fire in Claire's classroom, a bitter Russell finds he is unable to forgive the boy. Guest star Randolph Mantooth.
46	22	"A Hand Up Is Not a Handout: Part 1"	Victor Lobl	William A. Schwartz	May 7, 1998	222
Claire awaits the arrival of her baby. Joe is released from jail and joins the family. Meanwhile, Josh, Hattie and Dinah head to Oklahoma City for a memorial service of the bombing.
47	23	"A Hand Up Is Not a Handout: Part 2"	Victor Lobl	E.F. Wallengren & Claire Whitaker	May 14, 1998	223
The family keeps vigil over ailing baby Grace. Meanwhile, Joe's ex-convict status causes friction between him and his co-workers.

=== Season 3 (1998–99) ===
No. overall	No. in season	Title	Directed by	Written by	Original release date	Prod. code
48	1	"Saving Grace: Part 2"	Victor Lobl	Steven Phillip Smith	October 1, 1998	301
Nathaniel is kidnapped by the woman whose family died because of Joe's (Richard Thomas) reckless driving. Meanwhile, Claire visits Darlene (Tracey Gold), a prisoner on death row who she is going to teach to read. Note: This episode begins on Touched by an Angel.
49	2	"Balancing Act"	Terrence O'Hara	William A. Schwartz	October 8, 1998	302
Dinah refuses to answer Josh's questions about rumors that she is sleeping with a football player, but Josh ultimately defends her honor when her friend Eric begins spreading rumors about her.
50	3	"Restoration"	Sandor Stern	Danna Doyle & Debbie Smith	October 15, 1998	303
Distracted by the restoration of her mansion, a status-conscious Southerner (Lee Purcell) does not notice her teenage daughter's (Hilary Salvatore) developing physical and emotional problems.
51	4	"Baptism of Fire"	Stuart Margolin	Story by : David Ehrman & Arnold Margolin; Teleplay by : Arnold Margolin & David Ehrman & Danna Doyle & Debbie Smith	October 22, 1998	304
Hatred erupts in a Mississippi town when the Greenes decide to help Erasmus and his friend Alicia (Ruby Dee) rebuild a torched church.
52	5	"Chasin' the Blues"	Will Mackenzie	Arnold Margolin	October 29, 1998	305
When Josh heads to Texas to save his runaway girlfriend, he winds up being rescued twice by a good Samaritan (Keb' Mo').
53	6	"Denver: Welcome Home"	Victor Lobl	William A. Schwartz	November 5, 1998	306
A landlord (Eugene Byrd) allows the Greenes to move into a run-down house rent free on the condition that Russell fixes up the place, but neighborhood bullies are furious when the Greenes take over their hangout. Meanwhile, Claire gets a job at the local school. First appearance of regular cast member Eugene Byrd as Lawrence "L.T." Taggert, Jr.
54	7	"Anywhere But Here"	Alan J. Levi	David Ehrman	November 12, 1998	307
Josh is attacked by a group of thugs, but is rescued by a homeless boy, prompting Russell and Claire to locate the child's alcoholic father, hoping to repair the shattered family.
55	8	"And Baby Makes Three"	Martha Mitchell	Arnold Margolin	November 19, 1998	308
Josh ignores the school rumors about his new girlfriend, until he meets her infant son.
56	9	"Out of Bounds"	Sandor Stern	Steven Phillip Smith	December 3, 1998	309
Russell volunteers at a local youth shelter, where he becomes the object of a young drug addict's (Amber Benson) affection. Meanwhile, L.T. is given an ultimatum from his gangster friends—help with a drug deal or live in fear.
57	10	"Jury Duty"	Terrence O'Hara	David Ehrman	December 17, 1998	310
Claire serves on a jury deliberating whether a mother (Anna Getty) negligently contributed to her child's death.
58	11	"The Visitor"	Victor Lobl	William A. Schwartz	January 7, 1999	311
The Taggarts are shocked to learn that L.T.'s presumed-dead father (Ben Vereen) is not only alive but is dying of prostate cancer.
59	12	"Wounded Hearts"	Alan J. Levi	Arnold Margolin	January 14, 1999	312
L.T.'s hostility towards his father nearly gets him expelled from school, so his father decides to leave. Meanwhile, Josh rethinks his relationship with Bobbie (Tinsley Grimes).
60	13	"All in the Family"	Stuart Margolin	Steven Phillip Smith	January 14, 1999	313
Russell teaches L.T. about forgiveness, but L.T. and Shamaya clash over their father's request to be buried next to their mother after he dies. Meanwhile, some parents oppose Claire's plan to help pregnant teens.
61	14	"Under Cover"	Victor Lobl	David Ehrman	March 25, 1999	314
L.T. interprets Claire's silence as racism when she fails to tell him that his new girlfriend (Monica McSwain) is actually not a high-school student.
62	15	"In the Money"	Stuart Margolin	William A. Schwartz	April 1, 1999	315
Russell risks losing a wealthy volunteer at the teen shelter, when he tells her to stop throwing money around and explains how the money could really help the kids. Meanwhile, Dinah and boyfriend Michael (Jesse Petrick) plan a weekend alone.
63	16	"Pursuit of Happiness"	Victor Lobl	Arnold Margolin	April 8, 1999	316
Claire worries that Josh's involvement with Bobbie could be a problem. Margot (Ashleigh Norman) is hit by a car and her mother's (Christine Healy) agoraphobia prevents her from visiting Margot in the hospital. Meanwhile, L.T.'s award-winning play is disqualified for its subject matter.
64	17	"What's in a Word"	Martha Mitchell	Steven Phillip Smith	April 15, 1999	317
Nathaniel hears L.T. using the word "nigger" with a black friend and assumes it is okay to use it with his own friend, who is outraged.
65	18	"A Day in the Life"	Victor Lobl	David Ehrman	Syndication	318
Russell subs for a sick security guard and experiences a disturbing "day in the life" of Claire's school. L.T. tries to help a friend avoid a rival gang's retaliation for a drive-by shooting. Note: This episode was actually omitted on its air date of April 22nd, 1999 out of sensitivity to the shooting at Columbine High that took place two days before on April 20th. Since then, the episode has been aired in reruns and included as a bonus episode on the DVD boxset of the series.
66	19	"Leaving the Life"	Robert Visciglia, Jr.	Steve Gottfried	April 29, 1999	319
With Russell's and L.T.'s assistance, a woman (Golden Brooks) tries to break away from her life of crime, after her gang leader (Cee Cee Michaela Harshaw) threatens to kill her and her family if she refuses to shoot a rival gang member.
67	20	"Baby Steps"	Larry Lipton	Arnold Margolin	May 6, 1999	320
L.T. and Vicki (Chad Morgan) pose as a couple in order to research and write a newspaper article on interracial dating. Margot struggles with her mother's independence. Russell and Claire disagree over whether he should become a police officer.
68	21	"Darkness Visible"	Stuart Margolin	David Ehrman	May 13, 1999	321
L.T. is assaulted by a schizophrenic man (Billy Dee Williams), who also steals his camera. L.T. then discovers the man was once a great photographer. Meanwhile, Dinah is worried she won't be asked to the spring dance, and Russell sees some police action.
69	22	"Finale"	Peter H. Hunt	Steven Phillip Smith	May 20, 1999	322
Hattie arrives for a surprise visit with her old friend Jim Staley (Rolf Stang), to announce the two of them are getting married. Meanwhile, L.T. discovers that a woman (Wanda De Jesus) sold her baby on the black market.

== See also ==
- List of Touched by an Angel episodes
