= Clipped Wings =

Clipped Wings may refer to:

- Wing clipping, in aviculture, a feather-trimming procedure
- Clipped Wings (1937 film), an American crime film by Stuart Paton
- Clipped Wings (1953 film), an American comedy starring the Bowery Boys
- "Clipped Wings" (Blue Thunder), a 1984 television episode
- "Clipped Wings" (Touched by an Angel), a 1997 television episode
- "Clipped Wings", a song by R. Kelly from Write Me Back
