= Chema Rodríguez =

Chema Rodríguez may refer to:

- Chema Rodríguez (filmmaker) (born 1967), Spanish filmmaker and writer
- Chema Rodríguez (handballer) (born 1980), Spanish handball player
- Chema Rodríguez (footballer) (born 1992), Spanish football defender
