= Touched by an Angel season 4 =

Touched by an Angel
- Season 4
- Starring: Roma Downey; Della Reese; John Dye
- No. of episodes: 27

Release
- Original network: CBS
- Original release: September 21, 1997 – May 17, 1998

Season chronology
- ← Previous; Season 3 Next → Season 5

The fourth season of the American dramatic television series Touched by an Angel premiered on CBS on September 21, 1997 and concluded airing on May 17, 1998, spanning 27 episodes. Created by John Masius and produced by Martha Williamson, the series chronicled the cases of two angels, Monica (Roma Downey) and her supervisor Tess (Della Reese), who bring messages from God to various people to help them as they reach a crossroads in their lives. They are frequently joined by Andrew (John Dye), the angel of death. A season set containing all of the episodes of the season was released to Region 1 DVD on August 31, 2004.

The episodes use the song "Walk with You", performed by Reese, as their opening theme.

== Episodes ==
| No. overall | No. in season | Title | Directed by | Written by | Original release date | Prod. code | Viewers (millions) |
|---|---|---|---|---|---|---|---|
| 64 | 1 | "The Road Home: Part 1" | Tim Van Patten | E.F. Wallengren & Mimi Schmir | September 21, 1997 | 403 | 23.18 |
Joe Greene returns to visit his family, but is hiding a horrible incident he caused, Tess vehemently confronts him about the many car accidents, already killing two people on the road, putting one child in the hospital. After receiving an inspiration from Monica, he finally tells his brother, Russell, about the scenes he caused on the road, when Russell (himself) also confronts him about his accidents on the road. Joe told his brother he wanted to make a change, when it was already too late. Guest stars: Gerald McRaney, Wendy Phillips, Austin O'Brien, Sarah Schaub, Faith Hill, Richard Thomas and Celeste Holm. Note: This episode concludes on Promised Land.
| 65 | 2 | "Great Expectations" | Tim Van Patten | Teleplay by : Christine Pettit & Rosanne Welch; Story by : Christine Pettit & Rosanne Welch and Mary Siversten & Lynn Wing | September 28, 1997 | 401 | 22.97 |
A expectant couple learns their baby will be born with down syndrome. This outrages the husband, a shop owner, who tells Monica he would give anything to have his child be like one young man who comes into his store with a typical "All-American" image, wearing a letterman jacket. Monica responds if he would really want his son to be like that when the supposed clean-cut young man stages an armed robbery of the shop, and in the gunfire wounds the wife. With both his wife and baby hospitalized in intensive care, the husband is visited by an angel with Down syndrome. Tess clarifies to the husband that perfect souls do not come in perfect bodies and that 'it’s not the packaging but the parenting' that will make the difference in a child's life Guest Stars: Bill Smitrovich and Chris Burke
| 66 | 3 | "Nothing But Net" | Victor Lobl | Daniel H. Forer & R.J. Colleary | October 5, 1997 | 402 | 18.80 |
A rebellious basketball player and terrible role model is idolized by a young boy. Having to appear in the announcer's box, Monica, Tess and Andrew all overlook at that next assignment. Guest stars: Alonzo Mourning, Cloris Leachman, Charles Malik Whitfield, Jamil Walker Smith, Paul Winfield and Alexis Cruz
| 67 | 4 | "Children of the Night" | Victor Lobl | Suzonne Stirling | October 12, 1997 | 404 | 22.94 |
The angels try to help a group of runaway children living on the streets. Prior to Tess and Monica working in an inner-city coffee shop, Monica begins to appoint herself with Andrew, while Tess and Rafael both encourage her partners to be patient, not to push so hard. Guest stars: Christopher Masterson, Rashaan Nall and Madeline Zima
| 68 | 5 | "Jones vs. God" | Sandor Stern | Ken LaZebnik | October 19, 1997 | 405 | 21.11 |
A man sues God for a drought that is crippling his town, therefore, Tess represents Him, while Monica is summoned to a witness in a lawsuit filed against Him by a South Dakota farmer who's representing a drought-stricken town. Guest stars: Debra Jo Rupp, J. Kenneth Campbell, John de Lancie and Robert Guillaume
| 69 | 6 | "The Pact" | Bethany Rooney | Teleplay by : Jennifer Wharton; Story by : Jennifer Wharton & Melissa Milne | October 26, 1997 | 406 | 21.67 |
When four HIV-positive girls at a summer camp make a suicide pact, Tess and Monica must find a way to stop them. Guest stars: Thora Birch, Ashleigh Aston Moore, Olivia Hack and Meagan Good
| 70 | 7 | "Sandcastles" | Victor Lobl | Burt Pearl | November 2, 1997 | 408 | 22.30 |
Tess, Monica, Andrew and Raphael discover a message in a bottle from a boy who says his mother is dying. Their help is needed from others prior to the search. Tess offers them the choice of both helping the boy, as well as Monica and Rafael set out to find Scooter in Pacific Falls. Guest stars: William Devane, Estelle Parsons and Alexis Cruz
| 71 | 8 | "My Dinner with Andrew" | Gabrielle Beaumont | Martha Williamson | November 9, 1997 | 409 | 26.94 |
Andrew is auctioned off as a date for a charity event. Little does he or Tess and Monica know that she is due to be taken from Earth soon. Guest stars: Charles Rocket, Morgan Fairchild and Stephanie Zimbalist
| 72 | 9 | "Charades" | Victor Lobl | Glenn Berenbeim | November 16, 1997 | 410 | 25.62 |
A high-powered Hollywood executive must face her family's past during the McCarthy era, where Tess and Monica arrive to help her who gets more than she bargained for after she asks her blacklisted father's best friend to appear on stage with her mother at an awards dinner. Guest stars: Janet Leigh, Joseph Campanella and Swoosie Kurtz
| 73 | 10 | "The Comeback" | Sandor Stern | Kenny Solms | November 23, 1997 | 411 | 26.67 |
A young woman trying to make it on Broadway gets a job costarring with a diva. When the young woman's mother comes to visit her, it is revealed that years ago, the mother and the diva were rival actresses, and the diva sabotaged the mother's big chance at a Broadway career. Guest stars: Carol Burnett, Rita Moreno, Carrie Hamilton, Carol Channing and Tim Conway Note(s): Carol Burnett and Carrie Hamilton were also mother and daughter in real life. Sadly, Carrie Hamilton died only 5 years after making this episode.
| 74 | 11 | "Venice" | Gabrielle Beaumont | R.J. Colleary | December 7, 1997 | 412 | 24.41 |
A woman starts to lose her vision before realizing her dream of visiting Italy. Monica and Tess help find the truth to a widow and three other people, who for years, been at odds because of suspicions surrounding the death of the woman's husband. Guest stars: Bonnie Bartlett and Piper Laurie
| 75 | 12 | "It Came Upon a Midnight Clear" | Michael Schultz | Ken LaZebnik | December 21, 1997 | 413 | 20.77 |
The angels revisit Wayne and Joey on Christmas. When Wayne goes missing, Monica tells Joey the story of how she met Mark Twain, while Tess, who's living in the present, arrives with the sheriff, who must also tell Joey that he found Wayne's truck, not Wayne, and that Joey's worry escalates. Guest stars: John Cullum, Randy Travis and Paul Winfield
| 76 | 13 | "Deconstructing Harry" | Burt Brinckerhoff | Burt Pearl | January 4, 1998 | 414 | 25.41 |
Tess and Andrew help a dead man's wife and mistress as they fight over his ashes. Guest stars: Polly Bergen, Lainie Kazan and Victoria Jackson
| 77 | 14 | "The Trigger" | Peter Hunt | Rosanne Welch & Christine Pettit | January 11, 1998 | 415 | 24.05 |
A troubled family dealing with an abusive situation hits its boiling point when the wife's sister shoot her husband. However, the wife is in denial about her husband's abuse, so Monica must pose as a cop so she uncover the truth and save her family, after Tess was given only one lesson from her, in ice skating, who also met the family. Guest Star: Gabrielle Carteris
| 78 | 15 | "Doodlebugs" | Terrence O'Hara | Ken LaZebnik | January 18, 1998 | 407 | 20.13 |
Residents of a small town believe God is speaking to them through a payphone where Tess tries to give him a chance to be responsible for the lie, when he couldn't muster the courage, therefore, he runs out on her, electing to deliver an apology letter to the aspiring singer. The bar was planning on the day of the grand opening, only to find the place was in flames, where they lost everything, even mortgaging the café. Tess, then acknowledges to the townspeople, asking them why they lost their faith, who also tells the minister to begin the search, where all successful searches begin, with The Lord. Guest stars: Adam Wylie, Chris Mulkey and Barbara Mandrell
| 79 | 16 | "Redeeming Love" | Burt Brinckerhoff | Marilyn Osborn & Kathleen McGhee-Anderson | February 1, 1998 | 416 | 24.10 |
A crack addict has a baby, whom she steals from the hospital, Monica tries to help her, while Tess teaches the lady's parents a lesson in tough love. Guest stars: Alanna Ubach and Dan Lauria
| 80 | 17 | "Flights of Angels" | Peter H. Hunt | Teleplay by : Ken LaZebnik; Story by : Sally Storch Bunkall & Sally Howell | March 1, 1998 | 419 | 21.57 |
An artist is diagnosed with ALS and must say goodbye to his wife and three boys, hence, Tess and Andrew represents him, during this time Monica to help take care of his wife's three boys. Guest stars: Gregory Harrison, Linda Purl and Haley Joel Osment
| 81 | 18 | "Breaking Bread" | Peter H. Hunt | Burt Pearl | March 8, 1998 | 417 | 22.52 |
Tess tries to prove to a shy baker, who is a witness to a hate crime and must confront an evil that has invaded his town. Guest star: Michael Chiklis
| 82 | 19 | "God and Country" | Bethany Rooney | R.J. Colleary & Glenn Berenbeim | March 15, 1998 | 418 | 22.24 |
A base commander and his soldier son are feuding while his other son is MIA, and it is up to the angels to help them reconcile by posing as military recruits. Tess blames Rafael for being the first angel to hit a case, in spite of her doing, all three landed in jail, Rafael learns that Col. Walls is actually Tomas's father, and has another son, who is missing in action in Bosnia. When the son is confirmed dead by Andrew, Monica must convince Col. Walls to face up to his own faults in order to save his and Tomas' relationship before its too late Guest Star: Edward James Olmos
| 83 | 20 | "How Do You Spell Faith?" | Bethany Rooney | Michael Glassberg | March 29, 1998 | 420 | 24.83 |
Andrew must help an introverted boy with a gift for spelling deal with the loss of his popular older brother, while Tess help his mother reconcile with him. Guest star: Bess Armstrong
| 84 | 21 | "Seek and Ye Shall Find" | Victor Lobl | Glenn Berenbeim | April 5, 1998 | 421 | 20.72 |
While traveling to a small Mississippi town, Tess and Monica discuss about a case, but Monica loses her memory when she slips and hits her head at a bus station, who doesn't know she's an angel or who God is, but she prays for help, and upon her recovery is able to restore the faith of an embittered doctor. Guest stars: Gary Grubbs, Irma P. Hall and Michael Moriarty
| 85 | 22 | "Cry, and You Cry Alone" | Gene Reynolds | R.J. Colleary | April 12, 1998 | 422 | 17.53 |
A comedic tells his friends about two aging, feuding who must reconcile in the time they have left, and it is up to Monica and Andrew to release their anger, after a 30 year estrangement to attend their induction into the Comedy Hall of Fame. To pay homage of the guys' request to go into the diner of the old neighborhood where they met, when a comic collapses and suffers from cardiomyopathy, Tess drives the men in the ambulance, to the hospital. Guest stars: Jack Carter, Johnny Brown, Johnny Dark, Tom Dreesen, Tom Poston and Jerry Stiller
| 86 | 23 | "Perfect Little Angel" | Terrence O'Hara | Teleplay by : Susan Cridland Wick; Story by : Susan Cridland Wick and Ann Elder & Jeannine Tree | April 26, 1998 | 423 | 22.73 |
A young beauty pageant contestant is hiding a son with a serious medical condition. Before Monica, Tess, Andrew and Rafael all agree to be her sponsors crowning her Miss Unincorporated Area #579, they all have to understand her, while being very unhappy. Guest stars: Ele Keats and Alexis Cruz
| 87 | 24 | "Elijah" | Peter H. Hunt | Glenn Berenbeim | May 3, 1998 | 424 | 19.54 |
A slumlord is sentenced to live in one of his own apartment buildings. Monica gives the slumlord an opportunity for the changes that need to be made, but intends to go around the law, offering her a bribe. When he was given the impression to hide from the police at his mother's place, where he was picked up right in the midst of the Passover meal, Tess introduces Jake as he attends his internment and places his ankle monitor on his leg to warn him that he's not to leave. Guest star: Bruce Davison
| 88 | 25 | "Last Dance" | Terrence O'Hara | Jennifer Wharton & R.J. Colleary | May 10, 1998 | 425 | 19.89 |
A teenage boy and girl's relationship is tested by the interference of their feuding mothers. Tess and Monica must hope all relationships don't self-destruct. Andrew, who works as a DJ, encourages all the high schoolers to respect everybody else and their bodies. Guest stars: Alley Mills and Karen Austin
| Special–1 | SPE1 | "True Stories From Touched by an Angel" | Jon Andersen | Martha Williamson & Daniel H. Forer | May 13, 1998 | TBA | 12.93 |
| 89 | 26 | "The Spirit of Liberty Moon" | Tim Van Patten | Martha Williamson | May 17, 1998 | 426 | 20.47 |
| 90 | 27 | "The Spirit of Liberty Moon" | Tim Van Patten | Martha Williamson | May 17, 1998 | 427 | 20.47 |
When Tess tests a kite, she immediately tells Monica and Andrew for their next assignment, where they both must cover a dissident, who returns to China to find her missing husband and daughter. Guest stars: Bai Ling, Adrian Pasdar and Russell Wong Note: In syndication, this is a two-part episode.
