= A Delicate Balance =

A Delicate Balance may refer to:

- A Delicate Balance (play), by Edward Albee
  - A Delicate Balance (film), an adaptation directed by Tony Richardson
- "A Delicate Balance" (Touched by an Angel episode)
