= So, What's Your Price? =

- Directed by: Olallo Rubio
- Written by: Olallo Rubio
- Produced by: Antonio Reyes; Lynn Fainchtein
- Cinematography: Jose Casillas
- Edited by: Olallo Rubio; Erich Martino; Alexis Navarrete
- Music by: Javier Umpierrez
- Distributed by: Film House
- Release date: May 18, 2007
- Running time: 98 minutes
- Countries: Mexico; United States
- Languages: English; Spanish

So, What's Your Price? (Spanish: ¿Y tú cuánto cuestas?) is a 2007 documentary directed by Olallo Rubio about media, power, and the consumer culture in Mexico and United States. It debuted in Mexico on May 18, 2007, and had several screenings on the United States, the DVD version was released on October 16, 2007.

== Production ==
Originally, the idea was that Olallo Rubio direct a documentary, so it could be sold as a straight to DVD film, while the money earned would go to the finance of This Is Not A Movie, another project of Olallo. Eventually, the project got bigger and it was called So, What's Your Price, using the budget of $100,000. The film was shot in the streets of New York and Mexico City. The film was first screened at a film festival in Guadalajara. In April 2007, it was announced that the film was going to be released May 18, 2007 in Mexico City. The film enjoyed positive reviews, so it was released in different places in Mexico. In July 2007, it was screened in New York with very positive reviews, and in October 2007 it was released on DVD.

== Synopsis ==
The film deals with the many differences between the United States and Mexico on an economic and cultural level, interspersed with the opinions of a series of impromptu interviews in both countries. Some of the topics discussed include drugs, money, the human body, the price of living, and how people see each other. So, What's Your Price takes a humorous approach to social wealth inequality, race and social stratification in Mexico and the country's relationship to the U.S. Mexican newspaper El Universal described the project as "a low-budget documentary that combines interviews with random everyday people, television skits and animated segments. It offers opinions of people from different social strata in the United States and Mexico and shows how capital determines the values of humanity and how the American consumer culture affects the habits of Mexicans."

== Release ==
The documentary premiered on March 24, 2007, at the Guadalajara Film Festival. On October 16, 2007, the DVD was released in a 2-disc special edition, with several extras, which included, two audio commentaries by the director, one in Spanish and one in English, the making of documentary called A Film For Sale, a podcast that includes fragments of interviews on the radio with the director, an interview with Stephen A. Bezruchka, the trailers, and a photo gallery.
