= A Home of Our Own =

1993 film by Tony Bill

- Theatrical release poster
- Directed by: Tony Bill
- Written by: Patrick Sheane Duncan
- Produced by: Dale Pollock; Bill Borden; Patrick Sheane Duncan
- Starring: Kathy Bates; Edward Furlong; Soon-Tek Oh
- Cinematography: Jean Lépine
- Edited by: Axel Hubert
- Music by: Michael Convertino
- Production companies: PolyGram Filmed Entertainment; A&M Films
- Distributed by: Gramercy Pictures
- Release dates: October 20, 1993 (Hamptons International Film Festival); November 5, 1993 (U.S.)
- Running time: 103 minutes
- Language: English
- Budget: $7.5 million
- Box office: $1.6 million

A Home of Our Own is a 1993 American drama film directed by Tony Bill, starring Kathy Bates and Edward Furlong. It is the story of a mother and her six children trying to establish a home in the small fictional town of Hankston, Idaho, in 1962.

== Plot ==
Frances Lacey, a widow, is fired from her job at a potato chip factory when she is groped by her supervisor and defends herself. The same day, her eldest son Shayne is brought home by the police for stealing change from payphones, but they don't press charges. Deciding that Los Angeles is an unfit place to raise a family, Frances packs the kids up, sells everything they can't carry, and drives the family out of state in search of a new life. When their money runs out, Frances trades her wedding ring for car repairs, describing her late husband as a "vagabond Irish Catholic son-of-a-bitch". Their meager resources get them as far as Hankston, Idaho, where Frances spots the unfinished frame of a wood house a few miles outside town, across the road from Moon's Nursery. Finding that the proprietor of the nursery, Mr. Munimura, is the owner of the property; though virtually penniless, Frances proposes to buy it from him in exchange for work by her and her children, whom she collectively calls the "Lacey Tribe".

As winter approaches, the Laceys work hard to make the house habitable. Though cold and untrusting at first, Mr. Munimura warms to the family, helping them build and becoming an uncle-like figure to the children. Frances finds a job as a waitress at a bowling alley in Hankston and puts every dollar she can spare into improvement of the house. Shayne finds work at a local dairy, and middle son Murray begins helping out at a local scrapyard, earning various home improvement items as payment. At Christmas, the kids are disappointed when they receive construction tools as gifts. Shayne accuses Frances of putting her own dream before her kids' interests, but is saved from punishment by a visit from Mr. Munimura. Mr. Munimura reveals to Frances that he and his late wife began building the house for their son, who died fighting in Korea. That night, eldest daughter Lynn gives Frances her last present; a floral-pattern blouse she had previously liked in the church's donation bin.

After being humiliated by his gym teacher, Shayne meets a fellow classmate, Raymi, and falls in love. Meanwhile, Frances begins to date her manager Norman, much to Shayne's disapproval. One night, as Shayne takes Raymi to a school dance, Norman turns hostile and assaults Frances. As Shayne dresses her wounds, Frances tells him of his father, remarking he was the only man who was good to her. In a change of heart, Frances takes her husband's belt, which she used for discipline, and nails it to a tree. Shayne later finds Norman at the bowling alley and attacks him, but Norman overpowers him. Frances goes to the bowling alley's owner, Mr. Hilliard, to quit, but learns Norman was fired instead and she is given the day off.

In the dead of winter, the Laceys install indoor plumbing into their home. In celebration, Murray sets fire to their old outhouse, but inadvertently burns the house down as well. Though the family loses most of everything they own, Frances finds their meager savings in a jar amidst the charred ruins. Hope is reborn for Frances, but Shayne angrily demands a reality check and once again accuses her of putting her pride ahead of the family's needs; in response, Frances dares him to return to Los Angeles and live on his own. All seems lost for the Laceys, until Mr. Munimura arrives with professional townsfolk and supplies to rebuild. Though Frances protests, Mr. Munimura assures her that her house will be rebuilt and hugs her. Toys, clothes, and blankets are also provided for the children. Frances only lets them build the house as far as it was before the fire, firm that all will be repaid.

Shayne, narrating, says that it took them six months to finish the rest of the house, and four years to pay everyone back, but that it brought them all closer together as a family. Even though he hated Idaho at first, he still lives there, and has never been back to Los Angeles.

== Cast ==
- Kathy Bates as Frances Lacey
- Edward Furlong as Shayne Lacey
- Clarissa Lassig as Lynn Lacey
- Sarah Schaub as Faye Lacey
- Miles Feulner as Murray Lacey
- Amy Sakasitz as Annie Lacey
- T. J. Lowther as Craig Lacey
- Soon-Tek Oh as Mr. Munimura
- Tony Campisi as Norman
- David Jensen as Mr. Hilliard
- Tamilisa Wood Miner as Raymi

== Production ==
Screenwriter Patrick Sheane Duncan based the story on his own childhood experience of moving from Los Angeles after his father was killed in a barroom brawl. Duncan's mother relocated all twelve of her children to Michigan where she found work as a fruit picker to sustain the family.

Principal photography began on October 26, 1992, and concluded on December 19. Parts of the film were shot in Heber, Wasatch Mountain State Park and Midway, Utah.

== Critical reception ==
Roger Ebert awarded the film 3 out of 4 stars and wrote, "This situation, set in the 1960s, could be the set-up for a sitcom, or a retread of an old Disney family yarn. It ends up being a lot more, partly because Kathy Bates brings a solid, no-nonsense clarity to what could have been a marshmallow role, and partly because the director, Tony Bill, is too smart to go for heart-wrenching payoffs until the very end of the film, when they work so well that I actually felt some tears in my eyes." He concluded "This is not a great movie, but it has a big heart."

Other reviews criticized the film for its overt sentimentality and manipulativeness.
