= Touched by an Angel season 3 =

Touched by an Angel
- Season 3
- Starring: Roma Downey; Della Reese; John Dye
- No. of episodes: 29

Release
- Original network: CBS
- Original release: September 15, 1996 – May 18, 1997

Season chronology
- ← Previous; Season 2 Next → Season 4

The third season of the American dramatic television series Touched by an Angel aired CBS from September 15, 1996, through May 18, 1997, spanning 29 episodes. Created by John Masius and produced by Martha Williamson, the series chronicled the cases of two angels, Monica (Roma Downey) and her supervisor Tess (Della Reese), who bring messages from God to various people to help them as they reach a crossroads in their lives. They are frequently joined by Andrew (John Dye), the angel of death. Two DVD sets, together containing all of the episodes of the season, were released to Region 1 DVD on February 7 and November 28, 2006.

The episodes use the song "Walk with You", performed by Reese, as their opening theme.

== Episodes ==
No. overall	No. in season	Title	Directed by	Written by	Original release date	Prod. code	Viewers (millions)
36	1	"Promised Land"	Michael Schultz	Martha Williamson	September 15, 1996	223	19.3
Tess helps a factory worker to build the faith, as she and the rest of the angels help the Greene family begin a cross-country trip so that they can help other people along the way. Guest stars: Gerald McRaney, Wendy Phillips, Austin O'Brien, Sarah Schaub, Celeste Holm and Ossie Davis Note(s): This backdoor episode is the pilot for Promised Land. John Dye does not appear in this episode.
37	2	"A Joyful Noise"	Peter Hunt	Katherine Ann Jones	September 21, 1996	302	18.5
Monica and Tess helps a child psychiatrist recover from a traumatic event that is influencing his ability to treat young patients. Guest stars: Dwight Schultz, Jane Sibbett, Mika Boorem and Olympia Dukakis
38	3	"Random Acts"	Tim Van Patten	R.J. Colleary & Martha Williamson	September 22, 1996	303	20.68
Monica, looking so subdued, stands on the woods, who's recollecting on the events that happened before. Tess, appears encourages her, days humans behave so badly to one another that it’s all an angel can do to keep loving them. After that, Monica reinstates as to how the assignment began. A disillusioned teacher questioning his twenty-year career endures a violent encounter with a former student. Monica goes to school as his student teacher, when she couldn't help the teacher. She also gets a revelation from Tess to use her 'gift words' to help them. She also confronted one of his problems students who had the withheld information about his whereabouts. Guest stars: Channon Roe, Dante Basco and John Ritter
39	4	"Sins of the Father"	Tim Van Patten	Debbie Smith & Danna Doyle	September 29, 1996	301	19.30
Monica interviews a young gangbanger on death row while Tess and Andrew tries to prevent his younger brother from following in his footsteps. Guest stars: Carl Lumbly, De'Aundre Bonds, Robert Ri'chard and Debbie Allen
40	5	"Written in Dust"	Peter Hunt	Teleplay by : Ken LaZebnik; Story by : Ken LaZebnik & Jack LaZebnik	October 6, 1996	304	17.8
An archaeologist gets a surprise visit from his grandfather while on a dig at a Navajo excavation site. Before Tess and Monica would feud with each other, they posed as both the research assistant and a photographer. Later, the archaeologist finds evidence of that atrocity. While searching for him, his grandfather approaches Tess, who reveals herself and tells him only the archaeologist can reconcile himself to God, before his grandfather dies of a heart attack, after falling into the cave. Guest stars: Adam Beach, Corey Parker, Harold Gould and Russell Means
41	6	"Secret Service"	Bethany Rooney	Kathleen McGhee-Anderson	October 13, 1996	305	18.99
Monica poses as a secret service agent and serves as a chief rival to an ambitious female agent, whilst Tess works as the attending nurse, telling the female agent, the trauma of the bullet wound has caused one of Ulysses’ kidneys to shut down. If he doesn’t have a transplant soon, he will die. Commenting on the crisis, Tess tells Monica, it’s ironic that so many people are willing to sacrifice their lives for the senator, but only one can save Ulysses. The following day the agent, finds out she's a viable donor to rescue her friend, when she disqualifies to become a field agent. Guest stars: Ben Vereen, Roy Thinnes and Heidi Swedberg
42	7	"Groundrush"	Peter Hunt	Story by : Glenn Berenbeim; Teleplay by : Burt Pearl	October 27, 1996	306	21.10
Monica believes her charge, the owner of a small aviation company, is innocent when arrested by the FBI. Tess calms the man's future stepson, when not sure is to make one of these recollections. Guest stars: Robert Hays and Paul Winfield
43	8	"The Sky Is Falling"	Victor Lobl	Glenn Berenbeim	November 3, 1996	307	19.70
Monica is hired to attend to a recently widowed senior and they recall the night she and Tess met during the first radio broadcast of Orson Welles' "The War of the Worlds". Guest stars: Brian Keith, Estelle Getty, Allyce Beasley and Ray Buktenica
44	9	"Something Blue"	Terrence O'Hara	Susan Cridland Wick & Jennifer Wharton	November 10, 1996	308	22.33
The angels serve as wedding coordinators and help a young couple face a sobering medical news on their wedding day. Kevin has written his wedding vows, while Alison hasn't written her own vows, yet. While Tess tries to keep the wedding guests entertained, it becomes evident the wedding may not occur. Amidst the chaos, a mysterious blue envelope goes unnoticed in the bridal prep room. Alison’s father shows up, while Tess reveals she invited him. Kevin’s parents comfort him, while Tess urges Alison’s mother, Harriet to tell the truth, Stan wrote to Alison all these years like he promised. Harriet withheld the letters, initially out of spite for her ex-husband, then to cover her own deception. Guest stars: Linda Kelsey and Sally Kellerman
45	10	"Into the Light"	Victor Lobl	R.J. Colleary	November 17, 1996	309	21.16
A man with a heart condition and criminal past has a near-death experience and realizes he must change his ways after befriending a young teen girl with cystic fibrosis, in the hospital, where Tess and Monica poses as nurses, where a man must perform his community service for the crime that he has committed. Guest stars: Kirsten Dunst and David Marciano
46	11	"Homecoming: Part 1"	Peter Hunt	William Schwartz & Martha Williamson	November 24, 1996	310	22.66
A female drug-addict and street walker enters a halfway house administered by Tess and turns out to have a connection to the Greene family. Guest stars: Delta Burke and Ossie Davis Note: This episode concludes on Promised Land.
47	12	"The Journalist"	Tim Van Patten	Ken LaZebnik	December 1, 1996	311	21.14
An investigative reporter runs a report on an elderly couple with foster children, but it turns out her information came from a dubious source. Now Monica and Andrew, with angel Sam, must help fix the damage. As evasive as Tess's roundabouts were concerned, the special agent angel tells the duo he is supervising them because of the universal ramifications of broadcasting. Guest stars: Kay Lenz and Paul Winfield Note: Della Reese does not appear in this episode. This is the first episode ever in which she does not appear.
48	13	"The Violin Lesson"	Peter Hunt	Glenn Berenbeim	December 22, 1996	312	18.61
A violin maker's son comes home for Christmas to reveal that he is gay and dying of AIDS. The angels help the family to accept this devastating news. Guest stars: Peter Michael Goetz and Millie Perkins
49	14	"Forget Me Not"	Michael Schultz	Burt Pearl	January 12, 1997	313	24.25
The angels help a librarian and her daughter deal with the mother's overprotective personality and her difficult medical diagnosis. Guest stars: Carol Lawrence and Isabella Hofmann
50	15	"Smokescreen"	Victor Lobl	Christine Pettit & Rosanne Welch	January 19, 1997	314	21.26
A lawyer returns home to defend a tobacco company, from which Tess represents the plaintiffs in a class-action lawsuit, but when he discovers who he's facing, he must decide what is the right thing to do. Guest stars: Kadeem Hardison, Holly Robinson Peete and Ja'Net DuBois
51	16	"Crisis of Faith"	Peter Hunt	William Schwartz	February 2, 1997	316	21.25
A simple assignment turns into a crisis when a devoted preacher is overwhelmed with guilt after being involved in fatal car accident. Monica and Tess are awaringly unseen, who are eventually joined by Andrew, when it becomes evident the patient cannot be resuscitated, the angels reflect the time that it happened so that they can help the preacher heal from the tragedy. Guest star: Chad Everett
52	17	"Angel of Death"	Tim Van Patten	Story by : George Taweel & Rob Loos; Teleplay by : Glenn Berenbeim	February 9, 1997	317	21.94
A magician, who calls himself the "Angel of Death", tries to perform a dangerous trick and is haunted by a tragic memory from his childhood, who was taught by Tess, whilst in a Las Vegas showroom to visit an illusionist. When the original magician's assistant was fired, Monica poses as a magician's assistant for an entertainer who bills himself as the "Angel of Death." Guest stars: Hudson Leick, Corbin Bernsen, David Leisure and Jeanne Cooper Note: Jeanne Cooper was the real-life mother of Corbin Bernsen.
53	18	"Clipped Wings"	Robert J. Visciglia, Jr.	R.J. Colleary	February 16, 1997	315	21.64
The fallen angel Kathleen returns to ruin Monica's performance evaluation. Tess and Andrew began to become more concerned about this situation, while being patient for Monica. Guest stars: Cloris Leachman, Maureen McCormick, James Earl Jones, Jasmine Guy and Abe Vigoda Note(s): This episode features flashbacks to previous episodes of the first three seasons. It is also the third and final appearance of Kathleen.
54	19	"Amazing Grace: Part 1"	Victor Lobl	Martha Williamson	February 23, 1997	318A	18.07
Tess visits the Greene family to take the eldest son Josh on an assignment. Guest stars: Loretta Devine, Al Jarreau, Jenifer Lewis, George Newbern, Esther Rolle, Lynn Whitfield and Lou Gossett Jr. Note: This episode concludes on Promised Land.
55	20	"Labor of Love"	Jim Johnston	Susan Cridland Wick	March 9, 1997	319	24.42
A pediatrician surprises her husband on a flight to Paris, but discovers a secret with huge ramifications, a case which Tess and Monica are assigned to. Guest stars: Hudson Leick, Alice Ghostley, Ben Masters, Priscilla Presley and Paul Winfield
56	21	"Have You Seen Me?"	Stuart Margolin	Story by : R.J. Colleary; Teleplay by : Pamela Redford Russell	March 16, 1997	320	23.01
A boy discovers a picture of his younger brother on the back of a milk carton, where Monica, Tess and Andrew are on the loose to unravel the mystery, identifying himself as a missing child. Guest star: Stuart Margolin
57	22	"Last Call"	Gene Reynolds	Ken LaZebnik	March 30, 1997	321	22.30
Monica is tasked to give a miracle to someone in a bar, where she watch Tess sings. She also completes and says the Lord has given her this assignment, a miracle to give to someone else in the bar. Guest stars: Clifton Powell, Clive Revill, Eddie Jones, Edie McClurg and Tim Reid
58	23	"Missing in Action"	Tim Van Patten	Rosanne Welch & Christine Pettit	April 13, 1997	322	20.63
Monica transforms into an 80-year-old woman and is assigned to an elderly army veteran living in a retirement home. Tess responds to the fact that he need to be understood, who in turn, gives Monica's swing a push. Guest stars: Christina Pickles and Darren McGavin
59	24	"At Risk"	Victor Lobl	Kathleen McGhee-Anderson	April 27, 1997	323	23.18
The angels serve in a work program at a juvenile detention center and try to help a troubled teen. There, Tess stops by the organization, who made the announcement she's the new facility director and will be overseeing a new work experimental program. Guest stars: Vicellous Reon Shannon, Camryn Manheim, Michael Peña and J.A. Preston
60	25	"Full Moon"	Tim Van Patten	Glenn Berenbeim	May 4, 1997	324	20.11
A wife and husband deal with the news that her former attacker is about to be paroled from prison. Afraid of the fireman to recognize anything about the letter, the rapist's wife comes to Tess, who works at the receptionist at a Crisis Center, while Monica, works as a counselor, especially when the caseworker angel refuses to draw the fireman's wife out, the distraught mother invites her to attend the parole hearing. Guest stars: Alex McArthur, Chris Noth and Jessica Steen
61	26	"An Angel by Any Other Name"	Gabrielle Beaumont	Burt Pearl	May 10, 1997	325	15.71
A snooty woman campaigns to close a Down syndrome group home that opened next door to her. She changes her mind after she suffers a stroke and the people with down syndrome offer to help her with her recovery. Guest stars: Chris Burke and Diane Ladd
62	27	"Inherit the Wind"	Michael Schultz	R.J. Colleary	May 11, 1997	326	20.49
After his father's death, a spoiled son is angered when he learns he must go on a mission before receiving his inheritance. Hoping to show him the meaning of hard work, Monica accompanies him. Along the way, he receives a word of wisdom from a dishwasher, the 'Angel of Music.' Unseen, Monica and Tess are uncomfortable by the excess of the host, having a drinking party, with his friends. The host's father confronts him, but exits in a disgusting way. Guest stars: Keb' Mo', Charlie Schlatter, Cloris Leachman, Paul Winfield and Bill Cosby
63	28	"A Delicate Balance"	Tim Van Patten	Teleplay by : Debbie Smith & Danna Doyle; Story by : Jennifer Wharton	May 18, 1997	327	22.17
The angels try to help a gifted gymnast, who has an overbearing mother who focused more on her than on her neglected son, who ends up in a serious situation. The family is also hiding the trauma of losing their father, which has caused them to be despondent. Guest stars: Anndi McAfee, Dee Wallace, Mary Elizabeth Winstead and Nadia Comaneci
