= Edward Furlong =

American actor (born 1977)

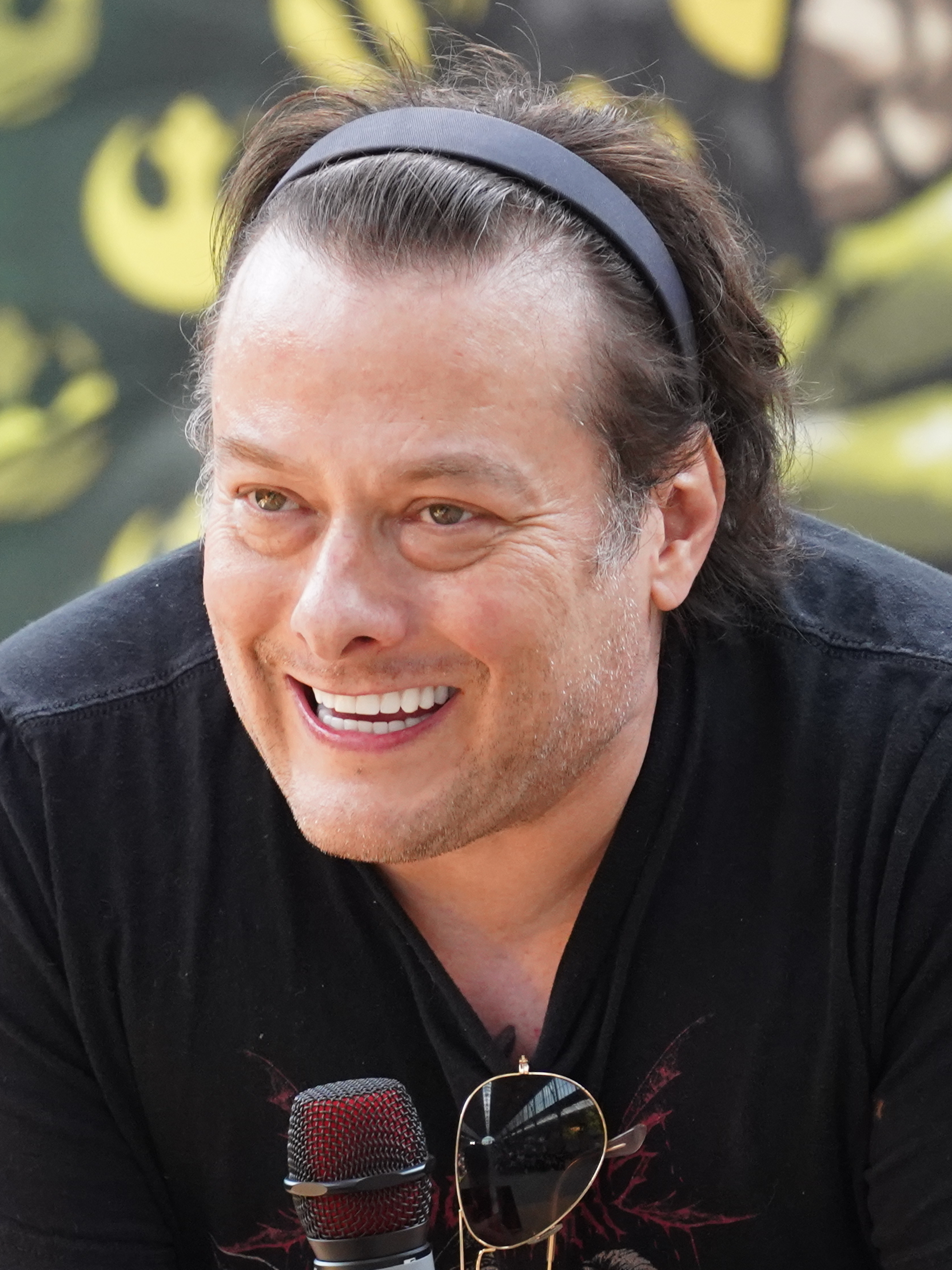
- Furlong in 2021
- Born: Edward Walter Furlong; August 2, 1977 (age 49); Glendale, California, U.S.
- Occupation: Actor
- Years active: 1990–present
- Spouse: Rachael Bella (m. 2006; div. 2014)
- Children: 1

Edward Walter Furlong (born August 2, 1977) is an American actor. He won a Saturn and an MTV Movie Award for his breakthrough performance at age 13 as John Connor in James Cameron's 1991 science fiction action film Terminator 2: Judgment Day.

Following Terminator 2: Judgment Day, Furlong earned a second Saturn Award nomination for his work in Pet Sematary Two (1992) and gave an Independent Spirit Award-nominated turn in American Heart (1992). He also won a Young Artist Award for his performance in A Home of Our Own (1993). Furlong starred in the 1998 films Pecker and American History X, receiving another Young Artist Award nomination for his work in American History X. He played leading roles in Detroit Rock City (1999) and Animal Factory (2000).

As an adult, Furlong's career has been affected by substance abuse. He has spent time in jail and in drug rehabilitation. In 2022, he announced that he had reached four years of sobriety.

== Early life ==
Edward Furlong was born August 2, 1977 in Glendale, California. The son of Eleanor Torres (née Tafoya), Furlong is of Mexican descent on his mother's side and has also described himself as "part Russian". Furlong has a maternal half-brother, Robert, who was born in 1981. As of 1991, Furlong had never met his biological father.

In the early part of Furlong's childhood, he and his half-brother were raised by his mother and his stepfather, Torres's then-husband Moises Torres. The couple's marriage ended before Furlong appeared in Terminator 2. Furlong began residing with his aunt, Nancy Tafoya, and his mother's half-brother, Sean Furlong, in 1990 following a disagreement with his mother. A custody battle between Furlong's mother and his aunt and uncle followed. Nancy Tafoya and Sean Furlong obtained custody of Furlong. Initially, when Furlong became an actor, the two served as his managers.

Furlong's uncle, Sean Furlong, filed a statutory rape complaint against Furlong's tutor, Jacqueline Domac. Domac engaged in a romantic relationship with Furlong when he was a minor. Sean Furlong was unsuccessful in having Domac prosecuted.

Furlong did not complete high school.

== Career ==
=== 1990s ===
Furlong as John Connor in Terminator 2: Judgment Day (1991)

Furlong began his film career by playing John Connor in Terminator 2: Judgment Day. He was discovered for the part by casting director Mali Finn while visiting the Pasadena Boys and Girls Club. None of the child actors who had auditioned for the role were "streetwise" enough to portray the character, so Finn looked to recruit someone without acting experience. When Furlong's first reading for the part did not go well, director James Cameron was inclined to look for someone else; however, Finn persuaded him to give Furlong another chance. Ultimately, Furlong was cast as Connor. Terminator 2: Judgment Day was released in the summer of 1991 and became "the biggest movie of 1991" and "one of the great feel-bad blockbusters of all time". His work in the film earned Furlong an MTV Movie Award for Best Breakthrough Performance and a Saturn Award for Best Performance by a Younger Actor.

Furlong's role in Terminator 2 made him a teen heartthrob and a star.

Furlong followed his role in Terminator 2 with appearances alongside Anthony Edwards and Clancy Brown in Pet Sematary Two (1992); Jeff Bridges in American Heart (1992); Kathy Bates in A Home of Our Own (1993); Tim Roth, Maximilian Schell and Vanessa Redgrave in Little Odessa (1994); and Meryl Streep and Liam Neeson in Before and After (1996). He was featured in Aerosmith's music video for "Livin' on the Edge". Furlong received another Saturn nomination for Best Performance by a Younger Actor for his work in Pet Sematary Two, was nominated for an Independent Spirit Award for Best Male Supporting Actor for his work in American Heart, and won a Young Artist Award for Best Youth Actor Leading Role in a Motion Picture Drama for his work in A Home of Our Own.

Furlong starred as Michael Brower, a horror and videogame-obsessed teen, in the horror film Brainscan (1994) and starred in the film adaptation of Truman Capote's The Grass Harp in 1995. Furlong reprised his role as John Connor in a Universal Studios theme park attraction known as T2-3D: Battle Across Time alongside Linda Hamilton, Arnold Schwarzenegger and Robert Patrick.

In 1998, Furlong played the title role in Pecker, a comedy directed by John Waters, and starred in American History X alongside Edward Norton. For his work in American History X, Furlong was nominated for a Young Artist Award for Best Performance in a Feature Film - Supporting Young Actor. Of his title role in Pecker, Furlong stated, "It's true most of the characters that I've played so far are kind of like suicidal. Really dark roles, which I like. But I wanted to do something different and John gave me a chance to do that." Also in 1998, he starred in the film Detroit Rock City.

=== 2000s ===
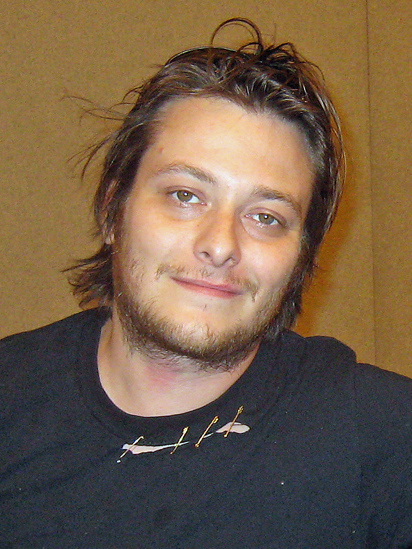
Furlong at the 2009 London Film Con

Furlong played a convict in Steve Buscemi's film Animal Factory (2000).

Furlong's career as an adult has been affected by substance abuse. His career declined considerably after 2000, with most of his subsequent films being released straight to DVD. In 2001, he played a lead role in the medieval drama The Knights of the Quest, a little-seen film by Italian filmmaker Pupi Avati. He was expected to play John Connor again in Terminator 3: Rise of the Machines (2003); however, the role was recast and given to Nick Stahl shortly before filming began. Furlong lost the role due to a drug overdose.

In 2004, Furlong appeared in a music video for Metallica's "The Unnamed Feeling". He also played Jimmy in the low budget independent film Jimmy & Judy (filmed in 2004, released in 2006). He played the eponymous lead in the superhero film franchise The Crow's fourth film, The Crow: Wicked Prayer (2005), co-starring with David Boreanaz and Tara Reid. The film was widely panned by critics and audiences. He appeared in Night of the Demons, the 2009 remake of the 1988 horror classic.

Furlong appeared in seasons three and six of the television program CSI: NY as villain Shane Casey.

=== 2010s ===
Furlong starred in This Is Not a Movie (2010), an English-language Mexican experimental science fiction comedy written and directed by Olallo Rubio and co-starring Peter Coyote and Edi Gathegi. He played a small but important role in Seth Rogen's superhero film The Green Hornet (2011). He played in the 2013 supernatural horror film Awakened, and was featured as Fixer in the science fiction film Star Trek: Renegades (2015).

In July 2019, James Cameron confirmed that Furlong would be returning to the role of John Connor in the then-upcoming science fiction action movie Terminator: Dark Fate. Because the story depicted his character shortly after the events of Terminator 2, Furlong's facial likeness was used via CGI, with teenaged Jude Collie being used as a body double. Furlong was involved in filming for facial capture purposes for the opening scene of the movie, which depicts a young John Connor being killed.

=== 2020s ===
In 2023, Furlong appeared in the movie Charlie's Horse/Heart of a Champion. In 2024, he appeared in the crowdfunded independent horror-thriller film The Forest Hills. Also in 2024, Furlong starred in the Lovecraftian horror film Unspeakable: Beyond the Wall of Sleep.

== Personal life ==
Furlong met Jacqueline Domac in 1990 when he was 13 years old and she was 26, working as an assistant on the T2 film set. She began tutoring him in September 1992. By September 1993, their relationship had become romantic and they were living together in Domac's Los Angeles residence; Furlong was 16 and she was 29. In May 1999, Domac sued Furlong for domestic violence and for 15 percent of his earnings from the previous three years, which she claimed that she was owed because she had allegedly worked for Furlong as his manager. The case was dismissed in October 1999.

Furlong dated actress Natasha Lyonne after meeting her during the filming of Detroit Rock City.

Furlong married actress Rachael Bella on April 19, 2006. The couple had a son, born in September 2006. On July 8, 2009, Bella filed for divorce, citing irreconcilable differences. Later in 2009, in an effort to allow Furlong to have parental visits with their child, Bella sought to dissolve a restraining order which she had previously filed against him. In 2012, Bella alleged in court documents that their then-six-year-old son had tested positive for cocaine, which led a judge to rule that Furlong's visits with him must be supervised. Their divorce was finalized in 2014.

Furlong dated actress Monica Keena intermittently from 2010 to 2023.

=== Substance use and legal problems ===
Furlong has experienced alcoholism and drug addiction. He first entered rehabilitation in October 2000. In 2006, Furlong stated he was "on and off" hard drugs from ages 22 to 26 and added: "I was a heroin and cocaine addict. It was really scary. ... I don't even think about (partying) anymore. It seems lonely now: Running and clubbing and doing coke. I have nightmares about doing hard drugs. I'll wake up and I'm like, 'Did I relapse?'"

In September 2009, Bella filed a restraining order against Furlong after he allegedly punched her while in a drug-fueled frenzy. In November 2010, he received three years of probation for violation of the civil protective order obtained by Bella.

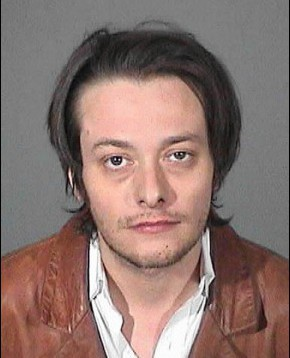
Furlong's mugshot in Los Angeles, 2014

In October 2012, Furlong was arrested and charged with felony domestic violence against his girlfriend Monica Keena. In November 2012, he was arrested for allegedly assaulting Keena. In January 2013, he was arrested and charged with misdemeanor battery against Keena and arraigned on an outstanding misdemeanor warrant for a December 12 misdemeanor domestic violence charge also involving Keena. In March 2013, he was sentenced to 180 days in jail for a violation of probation and of a protective order. He was arrested again in May 2013 for assault, battery, violating a restraining order, and dissuading a witness by force or threat and vandalism. He avoided a further prison sentence after agreeing to five years' probation, 90 days of drug rehabilitation, and one year of domestic violence counseling. He had spent 61 days in jail.

In August 2016, Furlong was arrested in Ventura for being under the influence of an illicit substance. At sentencing in February 2017, he was given the chance to complete a six-month drug rehabilitation in exchange for a suspended sentence of 36 months on probation.

After being arrested in August 2016 and sentenced in February 2017, Furlong spent a year at Wavelengths Recovery in Huntington Beach.

In February 2021, Furlong reunited with his American History X co-star Ethan Suplee, on Suplee's podcast American Glutton to discuss his recovery from drug addiction and compulsive eating. Speaking on his initial hesitation to maintain sobriety, he said, "I genuinely was afraid of facing what I would be without all that, because I carried all that as who I was". In 2022, Furlong stated that he had achieved four years of sobriety and had replaced his drug-damaged teeth with a new set.

== Filmography ==
=== Film ===
| Year | Title | Role | Notes |
|---|---|---|---|
| 1991 | Terminator 2: Judgment Day | John Connor | Acting debut |
| 1992 | Pet Sematary Two | Jeff Matthews | |
| 1992 | American Heart | Nick Kelson | |
| 1993 | A Home of Our Own | Shayne Lacey | |
| 1994 | Brainscan | Michael Brower | |
| 1994 | Little Odessa | Reuben Shapira | |
| 1995 | The Grass Harp | Collin Fenwick | |
| 1996 | T2-3D: Battle Across Time | John Connor | Short attraction film, a mini-sequel to Terminator 2: Judgment Day |
| 1996 | Before and After | Jacob Ryan | |
| 1998 | Pecker | Pecker | |
| 1998 | American History X | Danny Vinyard | |
| 1999 | Detroit Rock City | 'Hawk' | |
| 2000 | Animal Factory | Ron Decker | |
| 2001 | Porn Star: The Legend of Ron Jeremy | Himself | |
| 2001 | The Knights of the Quest | Simon Di Clarendon | Italian film originally titled I Cavalieri Che Fecero L'impresa |
| 2003 | Three Blind Mice | Thomas Cross | |
| 2005 | Intermedio | Malik | |
| 2005 | The Crow: Wicked Prayer | Jimmy Cuervo / The Crow | |
| 2005 | Cruel World | Philip Markham | |
| 2005 | Venice Underground | Gary | |
| 2006 | Jimmy and Judy | Jimmy Wright | |
| 2006 | The Visitation | Brandon Nichols | |
| 2006 | High Hopes | Tye | |
| 2006 | The Covenant: Brotherhood of Evil | David Goodman | Presented originally as Canes at the Cannes Film Festival of 2006 |
| 2006 | Warriors of Terra | Chris | |
| 2007 | Living & Dying | Sam | |
| 2008 | Dark Reel | Adam Waltz | |
| 2009 | Stoic | Harry Katish | |
| 2009 | Darfur | Adrian Archer | Released on DVD as Attack on Darfur |
| 2009 | Night of the Demons | Colin Levy | |
| 2010 | Kingshighway | Dino Scarfino | |
| 2011 | The Green Hornet | Mr. Tupper | |
| 2011 | This Is Not a Movie | Pete Nelson | |
| 2011 | The Mortician | Petrovsky | |
| 2011 | Below Zero | Jack / Frank | |
| 2011 | Witness Insecurity | Johnny | Released on DVD as Absolute Killers |
| 2011 | Tequila | Smith | |
| 2012 | For The Love of Money | Tommy | |
| 2012 | Crave | Ravi | |
| 2012 | Paranormal Abduction | Frank | |
| 2013 | Matt's Chance | Matt | |
| 2013 | The Zombie King | Samuel Peters / The Zombie King | |
| 2013 | Assault on Wall Street | Sean | Also known as Bailout: The Age of Greed |
| 2013 | Awakened | Thomas Burton | |
| 2014 | Stitch | Marsden | |
| 2014 | The Last Light | Noah | |
| 2014 | Aftermath | Brad | |
| 2015 | A Perfect Vacation | Berto | Also known as Awaken |
| 2016 | A Winter Rose | Willy | |
| 2017 | The Reunion | Skip | |
| 2019 | Terminator: Dark Fate | John Connor | Facial motion capture and reference only |
| 2023 | Heart of a Champion | Troy | |
| 2023 | The Forest Hills | Billy | |
| 2024 | Unspeakable: Beyond the Wall of Sleep | Ambrose London | |

=== Television ===
| Year | Title | Role | Notes |
|---|---|---|---|
| 1991 | Saturday Night Live | John Connor | Episode: "Linda Hamilton / Mariah Carey" (uncredited) |
| 1992 | The Tonight Show with Jay Leno | Himself | Guest |
| 1993 | Late Night with Conan O'Brien | Himself | Guest |
| 2001 | The Andy Dick Show | Himself | Episode: "Kid Krist" |
| 2003 | V Graham Norton | Himself | Guest |
| 2003 | On ne peut pas plaire à tout le monde | Himself | |
| 2005 | Poorman's Bikini Beach | Himself | Episodes: "Ms. Melt the Ice", "Perfect 10 Mansion", "Freakfest 2005" |
| 2006, 2010 | CSI: NY | Shane Casey | Episodes: "Hung Out to Dry", "Raising Shane", "Redemption", "The 34th Floor", "Vacation Getaway" |
| 2012 | Perception | Pete | Episode: "Nemesis" |
| 2012 | The Glades | Way N.E. Bey/Wayne Balldinger | Episode: "Public Enemy" |
| 2012 | Arachnoquake | Charlie | TV movie |
| 2014 | FanGirl Academy: 101 | Himself | Episode: "Movie Magic 101" |
| 2015 | Star Trek: Renegades | Fixer | Episode: "Pilot" |
| 2015–2016 | From the Mouths of Babes | Himself | Documentary |

=== Music videos ===
| Year | Title | Artist | Ref. |
|---|---|---|---|
| 1993 | "Livin' on the Edge" | Aerosmith | |
| 2004 | "The Unnamed Feeling" | Metallica | |
| 2007 | "Still in Love with You" | Five A.M. | |

== Awards ==
| Year | Award | Category | Film | Result |
|---|---|---|---|---|
| 1992 | MTV Movie Award | Best Breakthrough Performance | Terminator 2: Judgment Day | Won |
| 1992 | Saturn Award | Best Performance by a Younger Actor | Terminator 2: Judgment Day | Won |
| 1993 | Saturn Award | Best Performance by a Younger Actor | Pet Sematary Two | Nominated |
| 1994 | Independent Spirit Award | Best Supporting Male | American Heart | Nominated |
| 1994 | Young Artist Award | Best Youth Actor Leading Role in a Motion Picture Drama | A Home of Our Own | Won |
| 1994 | Young Artist Award | Outstanding Youth Ensemble in a Motion Picture (shared with Miles Feulner, Clarissa Lassig, Amy Sakasitz and Sarah Schaub) | A Home of Our Own | Nominated |
| 1998 | ACCA | Best Actor in a Supporting Role | American History X | Nominated |
| 1999 | Young Artist Award | Best Supporting Young Actor Performance in a Feature Film | American History X | Nominated |
