= Ilusión Nacional =

- Film poster
- Directed by: Olallo Rubio
- Written by: Olallo Rubio
- Produced by: Olallo Rubio; Jose Nacif
- Edited by: Juan Fontana
- Music by: Javier Umpierrez
- Release date: April 4, 2014
- Running time: 100 minutes
- Country: Mexico
- Language: Spanish

Ilusión Nacional (English: National Illusion) is a 2014 Mexican documentary film by Olallo Rubio about association football in Mexico.

== Plot ==
Olallo Rubio traces the history of association football in Mexico, and he discusses how it relates to Mexican politics and society. It is a chronological retelling of the Mexico national football team's participation in various international competitions.

The film consists entirely of archival footage of games, interviews of players, and narration from Rubio. It covers all the major matches from Mexico's international debut at the 1928 Summer Olympics and ends with the Mexico-Brazil match at the 2012 Summer Olympics in London.

It places heavy emphasis on all of Mexico's participation during the FIFA World Cup, including the times which Mexico hosted it in 1970 and 1986.

By the time it discusses the 1980's, it expands to include more effects on society and more of the political backdrop that the event entailed. When Mexico City hosted the 1986 cup, it was still reeling from the 1985 Mexico City earthquake which broke the sound system and forced fans to sing the national anthem acapella. Sports violence among participating nations and between fans of opposing nations is also briefly covered.

The film also covers a brief political scandal in the 1980's where Mexican players on the youth team were forced to sign fake documents alleging they were much younger than they were, and Mexico's subsequent disqualification from the next few cups.

Later, it discusses Mexico's participation in the U-17 Football competitions and its wins in 2005 and 2011.

The film closes with a monologue by narrator Eduardo Galeano of football's dramatic impact on society and its ability to uplift nations.

== Cast ==
- Olallo Rubio

== Production ==
Co-producer José María Yazpik said that previously shot footage comprises the film's visual content, but there is footage that has never been seen before.

== Release ==
Ilusión Nacional was released in Mexico on June 4, 2014, and was timed to coincide with the 2014 FIFA World Cup.

== Reception ==
Eric Ortiz Garcia of Twitch Film called it "little more than a recap of Mexico's history in the World Cup" and Rubio's worst documentary to date.
