= Jimmy and Judy =

- Directed by: Randall K. Rubin; Jon Schroder
- Written by: Randall K. Rubin; Jon Schroder
- Produced by: Randall K. Rubin; Ed Sanders; Gregory Scanlan; Jon Schroder
- Starring: Edward Furlong; Rachael Bella
- Cinematography: Ben Kufrin
- Edited by: Theodore Kent
- Music by: Benoit Grey
- Release date: September 15, 2006
- Running time: 99 minutes
- Country: United States
- Language: English
- Budget: $500,000

Jimmy and Judy is a 2006 independent film starring Rachael Bella as Judy and Edward Furlong as Jimmy. It is written and directed by Randall K. Rubin and Jon Schroder. The film was shot on hand-held video in the Cinéma vérité style.

== Plot ==
A teenage outcast road movie, Jimmy and Judy follows a pair of outsiders who fall in love and out of control as they travel across an American landscape dotted with hypocrisy, materialism, drugs and violence.

The film focuses on themes such as adolescent rebellion, love, and anger. Jimmy and Judy are modern-day Bonnie and Clyde: destructive young lovers who leave the comfort of their suburban community in rural Kentucky in search of a better life.

The film is presented in the form of a video diary from the point of view of the main characters.

== Cast ==
- Edward Furlong as Jimmy Wright
- Rachael Bella as Judy
- William Sadler as Uncle Rodney
- Chaney Kley as Dinko
- A. J. Buckley as Buddy
- James Eckhouse as Jimmy's father
- Gay Storm as Jimmy's mother

== Release and awards ==
Reviews were mixed. Jimmy and Judy won the Staff Award for Best Feature at the 2006 San Francisco Independent Film Festival and the MySpace.com award for Best Feature at the 2006 Newport Beach Film Festival.

Was released theatrically September 15, 2006 by Outsider Pictures.
