= Touched by an Angel season 5 =

Touched by an Angel
- Season 5
- Starring: Roma Downey; Della Reese; John Dye
- No. of episodes: 26

Release
- Original network: CBS
- Original release: September 20, 1998 – May 23, 1999

Season chronology
- ← Previous; Season 4 Next → Season 6

The fifth season of the American dramatic television series Touched by an Angel aired CBS from September 20, 1998, through May 23, 1999, spanning 26 episodes. Created by John Masius and produced by Martha Williamson, the series chronicled the cases of two angels, Monica (Roma Downey) and her supervisor Tess (Della Reese), who bring messages from God to various people to help them as they reach a crossroads in their lives. They are frequently joined by Andrew (John Dye), the angel of death. A season set containing all of the episodes of the season was released to Region 1 DVD on July 24, 2012.

The episodes use the song "Walk with You", performed by Reese, as their opening theme.

== Episodes ==
No. overall	No. in season	Title	Directed by	Written by	Original release date	Prod. code	Viewers (millions)
91	1	"Miles to Go Before I Sleep"	Peter H. Hunt	Story by : Jon Andersen; Teleplay by : Burt Pearl	September 20, 1998	502	19.58
Someone is dressing up in an angel costume, and claiming to be the angel of death as they visit dying patients in a hospital. The angels try to solve the mystery of who the fake angel is, while they help the dying patients cross over. Guest stars: Chad Lowe and Margot Kidder
92	2	"Saving Grace: Part 1"	Victor Lobl	Steven Phillip Smith	September 27, 1998	501	19.56
The angels discover that Joe Greene has been receiving threatening letters from Sondra Mills, whose husband Joe killed in a car accident a year ago. (Note: As depicted in the season 4 episode "The Road Home: Part 1" (1997)) Tess tries to help Sondra with her alcohol abuse, while Monica tries to help Sondra's son Matthew. Sondra is eventually fired for her drinking and kidnaps Nathaniel when Matthew is injured in an explosion. Guest stars: Karen Sillas, Tracey Gold, Richard Thomas and Ossie Davis Note: This episode concludes on Promised Land.
93	3	"What Are Friends For?"	Peter H. Hunt	Martha Williamson	October 4, 1998	504	19.44
Monica, Tess and Andrew are all assigned to a woman running for mayor who must decide between telling the truth and risking her approval rating, or being loyal to her friend who is in trouble with the law and risk losing everything. A mayoral candidate then hangs out at her old college hangout's place to locate Tom, who is waiting to hear the news of his most recent cancer test. Andrew who acts as a bartender, unbeknownst as to whether he'll be escorting Tom or not, the mayor candidate will resume her candidacy, formally announcing her candidacy for the office of mayor. As Carrie, Billy, and Tom, 'The Terrible Threesome' give a reunion performance, Tess tells Andrew and Monica, 'Sometimes memories keep people harmonizing long after the music is over.' Guest star: Sheila Kelley
94	4	"Only Connect"	Tim Van Patten	Ken LaZebnik	October 11, 1998	503	18.79
A boy who likes trains makes a new best friend after his mother dies and he and his father move to a new town. He is the only one in the town that doesn't judge his autistic friend, "Ferdie". He soon learns that Ferdie likes trains too, and doesn't recognize him without his baseball cap on. Things become more tense when his baseball-loving father becomes jealous of Ferdie. When communication problems become all-consuming for his father, Monica, Tess and Andrew eventually makes it the father's business in learning from the least likely of souls, of the autistic boy. Guest star: Joe Regalbuto
95	5	"The Lady of the Lake"	Michael Scott	Burt Pearl	October 18, 1998	506	19.44
Tess and Andrew teach Monica how to skip stones on Paradise Lake, who realize that this lake is "dead," where it is dying, and Monica must convince the townspeople not to sell to the developers, who are lying to them. Guest star: Dick Van Patten
96	6	"Beautiful Dreamer"	Peter H. Hunt	Glenn Berenbeim & Martha Williamson	October 25, 1998	507	17.08
Tess must convince a boy that "wanting to be a hitman" is not all that it's cracked up to be. She tells the children in school the story of Abraham Lincoln's assassination, and the consequences of John Wilkes Booth's actions. Guest stars: David Selby and Paul Winfield
97	7	"I Do"	Victor Lobl	R.J. Colleary	November 1, 1998	505	20.31
While an accident victim lies unconscious in a hospital bed, his fiancé and his controlling mother argue over whether or not to turn off the life support machines that are keeping him alive. Guest star: Patty Duke
98	8	"The Wind Beneath My Wings"	Stuart Margolin	Rosanne Welch	November 8, 1998	509	21.69
A woman's daughter, who is a judge, must face the fact that her mother is losing her memory, to prevent her from getting full potential, Tess and Monica try to help her. Guest stars: Veronica Hamel and Marion Ross
99	9	"Psalm 151"	Sandor Stern	Martha Williamson	November 15, 1998	508	23.50
Monica, Tess, and Andrew celebrate Monica's 100th assignment with a cake in a park. In the same park Audrey, a single mother who writes commercial jingles, celebrates her son Petey's birthday. Petey tries to blow out the candles but is racked with coughing, an effect of his disease which is cystic fibrosis. Monica arrives at Petey and Audrey's home as a prospective border and she meets Celine, Petey's best friend who is Celine Dion's number one fan. Celine introduces Monica to Audrey and Monica moves into their home. Together, they all must help Petey because he is dying and suffering from the harmful disease and need to complete his wish list before he dies and goes to heaven. Guest stars: Celine Dion and Wynonna Judd
100	10	"The Peacemaker"	Peter H. Hunt	Christine Pettit	November 22, 1998	510	21.40
A hostage negotiator and his wife have to deal with divorce, and the death of their son. In the midst of their family crisis, Andrew cautions Monica and Tess not to let time run out in representing this case. Guest stars: Bruce Boxleitner and Melissa Gilbert Note: Melissa Gilbert was married to Bruce Boxleitner in real-life.
101	11	"An Angel on the Roof"	Stuart Margolin	Ken LaZebnik	December 13, 1998	511	20.38
Monica must teach a bigoted old motel owner the meaning of love, hope, and compassion to a Mexican couple and a woman who is pregnant on Christmas Eve before he commits suicide. At the truck stop, while celebrating Christmas, Tess serves the three lonely truckers, coffee, who also shows them the inn, when their inspiration of thought the evening at the dilapidated motel. Guest star: Alexis Cruz
102	12	"Fool for Love"	Peter H. Hunt	Susan Cridland Wick & Burt Pearl	January 3, 1999	512	24.39
Sara Parker, an attorney is forced to come to terms with her past when she has to interrogate her ex-boyfriend. Rather than face him, she retreats to a bar and tells her story of 10 years to Monica. She reveals that her ex-boyfriend, Jesse, wanted her to sell her baby to the black market for $10,000, that she gave her baby to a church, and was abused by Jesse. Sam helps Sara get back on her feet, letting her stay in the motel and putting her through law school. While the lawyer retreats to the pub for some sanctuary and Monica who's a waitress at a bar, Tess serves drinks, who listens to the lawyer's story, who admits to Monica that Sam was the closest thing to an angel she has ever known. Monica tells her that she's absolutely right, that Sam is an angel, and that her, Tess, and Andrew are angels as well. Guest stars: Joey Lawrence and Paul Winfield
103	13	"The Medium and the Message"	Noel Nosseck	R.J. Colleary	January 10, 1999	513	19.21
Tess and Monica arrive at the office of a television network, where Monica tries to tell a network president he could do better by producing a show on angels. His mind changes when it is revealed 76% of all Americans believe in Angels. (Monica later says the actual number is higher, but people are too afraid or embarrassed). In order to change the network, on the outside, Tess must tell Monica to change the heart of the man. But his team doesn't think that angels are very "edgy". Monica describes her experiences as an angel, and that angels are indeed edgy. Monica then starts to tell them about Andrew, the angel of death. After they don't like his name and want him to be a zombie, Monica walks out and speaks to Irene, who tells him about his dream. When the Board of Directors is pressuring him, he asks Monica to pitch him. Monica continues her experiences. When his executive assistant Irene is killed in a bus explosion by a hijacker, Andrew reveals to Monica that Irene wanted Terence to use his script, "The Home of the Brave", and that a family values show based on morality is the way to go. Andrew comments he liked that idea of the angels show, but Monica replies that it would never take off. Guest stars: Conchata Ferrell and Alan Rosenberg Note: This episode features flashbacks of previous episodes on the first four seasons.
104	14	"My Brother's Keeper"	Peter H. Hunt	Teleplay by : Jennifer Wharton; Story by : Hoot Maynard & Jennifer Wharton	February 7, 1999	514	21.04
Tess and Monica arrive in Park City, Utah, for the ski race, where two best friends, who are both competing skiers, need to learn to settle their differences, but one ends up being a paraplegic and is in danger of dying because he doesn't want to live being stuck in a bed the rest of his life. Guest stars: David Lascher, Sean Murray and Brian Patrick Clarke
105	15	"On Edge"	Tim Van Patten	R.J. Colleary	February 14, 1999	515	22.17
The Angels must show a girl interested in skating that being a con artist and stealing is wrong and show her father, an expert con artist, that he must own up to his crime, stop stealing and be a proper father to his daughter. But his daughter takes the blame for the crime, wanting to stay in the town and not leave as he planned. Guest stars: Tara Lipinski and Jack Wagner
106	16	"The Man Upstairs"	Peter H. Hunt	Glenn Berenbeim	February 21, 1999	516	21.09
Gus Zimmerman is desperate. He needs money for his wife, Esther who is in a nursing home. Thinking he can get the extra money, he first gambles and loses. Then the person who is supposed to renew his contract is not there. Instead, in his place is a Satanic female angel identical to Monica. She reveals her name is Monique. As he gambles with her, and loses. He makes one final bet – the one he should not have made – with his soul. Monica must speak to Gus and set him straight about Monique's dishonesty, and show him the words he must speak and believe, until Tess knows about this. Guest star: Michael Jeter
107	17	"Family Business"	Tim Van Patten	Martha Williamson & R.J. Colleary	February 28, 1999	518	21.54
On the eve of their 35th wedding anniversary, Ben and Sylvia Mangione, owners of a car dealership, host a sale. Monica and Tess are on hand to help them with Phil, if he ever arrives. One of the children, Buddy calls to say he is returning with a big announcement to make. Soon the police arrive to say that Buddy has been killed in a crash. Then Buddy's wife turns up and later Buddy, who reveals he is dying of cancer. Ben needs to forgive Buddy. At the anniversary party, Tess fills in for the delayed Phil, who, in turn, plays with the band. Guest stars: Bill Cosby and Pat Hingle
108	18	"Anatomy Lesson"	Sandor Stern	Ken LaZebnik	March 7, 1999	517	23.06
Monica and Tess must show a pathologist who does not believe in God, the reason why a man who had a heart attack and where he was when he had it, so that he can rescue the little girl who is trapped down a hole and save his soul. And she has four hours to do it. Guest stars: Dan Butler and David Graf
Special–2	SPE2	"More True Stories"	Unknown	Unknown	March 10, 1999	TBA	8.93
109	19	"Jagged Edges"	Gregory Harrison	Jennifer Wharton & Burt Pearl	March 28, 1999	519	20.15
While helping a man with his household chores, after which he has a heart attack, Andrew assures a man he will give the box he wanted to give to his daughter which contains a secret. When his daughter arrives, she has bad memories of her past which she must deal with. In addition to this, she finds out her mother, she thought had died when she was young was still alive but in a mental hospital and had lost a baby, Tess and Monica talk to her about this. Guest star: Arabella Field
110	20	"Into the Fire"	Tim Van Patten	Brian Bird	April 4, 1999	520	18.71
After Melina Richardson is fired for shouting at a telemarketing customer on the telephone, Monica goes undercover joining the "Golden Path Institute" cult with her. Tess gives a required assignment to Monica about exposing the cult's leader Brother David as a religious impostor before his followers self-destruct as their final fate. Melina and the other cult followers take Monica's advice of continuing their everyday lives when David sets the chapel into bursting flames. All of them successfully evacuate the fiery building, but David passively refuses to allow Monica to rescue his soul from self-destruction. Andrew sends the cult leader's soul to Hell as punishment for not confessing his transgressions. Andrew and Monica subsequently give an acquaint greet to the former cult followers (including the Kitchell family) by using their actual names and identities. Guest stars: Cynthia Nixon, Spencer Garrett, Cynthia Ettinger, Brie Larson and Montel Williams
111	21	"Made in the U.S.A."	Bethany Rooney	Christine Pettit & Rosanne Welch	April 11, 1999	521	19.53
Nick Stratton, owner of Stratton Apparel, and a Vietnam veteran, hires Vietnamese women because they are willing to work for little pay. He hires Monica as his accountant the same day that Am Nhac Nguyen starts at the factory, pressing pants on a faulty steam press. All the women are willing to work for him because he will pay for citizen classes if they meet their daily quotas. Under pressure from his clients, Nick raises the quotas. When Monica asks Nick why he is so hard on his workers, he tells her his story. Tess teaches the students how the early Americans protested against the British, and Am Nhac decides to protest against the working conditions which backfires. Nick sacks everyone and when Andrew, an IRS agent, tells Nick he owes the government several thousand dollars in back taxes, Nick decides to blow the building up by planting a bomb. However, he gets trapped in the building, and Monica appears to him. She tells him that God loves him and is proud of him for saving someone's life. Nick asks God to forgive him for his hatred, as well as asking Am Nhac for forgiveness, and reveals he is the soldier who helped Cadao in Vietnam. Guest star: Eric Roberts
112	22	"Full Circle"	Victor Lobl	Daniel H. Forer	April 25, 1999	523	18.19
Monica re-enters the life of a former assignment, Kate Prescott, whose son Thomas had been accused of murder and acquitted. Kate's neighborhood is being leveled to make way for a highway, but she won't sell to the government. When Thomas finally returns, he has a son, 7-year-old Dylan. Kate sells the house, and encourages him to buy a coffee cart from Tess for $5,000. Instead he spends $10,000 on buying drugs by conning his mother into giving him the money. Monica tells Kate, but she refuses to believe her. Tess tells Kate he wasn't interested in buying the cart, and Thomas is caught dealing drugs in the park, for which he is arrested, but Kate is accidentally shot. Thomas flees and tries to commit suicide, but is talked out of it by Monica. He asks Kate to give her another chance, which she does. Guest stars: Valerie Harper and Anthony Michael Hall Note: This episode is a direct sequel to the season 2 episode "Flesh and Blood". Both Valerie Harper and Anthony Michael Hall return to play the same troubled mother and son.
113	23	"Black Like Monica"	Tim Van Patten	Martha Williamson	May 2, 1999	524	18.38
Monica runs into Tess on the side of a dirt road in a small Illinois town. As Tess is holding a bloodied noose, while crying, she also guides Monica, who must experience what it feels like to be black to help a black person with discrimination, hatred, and bigotry. In order for this to happen, she is transformed into a black woman. Guest stars: John Ritter and Rosa Parks
114	24	"Fighting the Good Fight"	Tim Van Patten	Michael Glassberg	May 9, 1999	522	17.83
Tim is tired of being bullied and wants to learn boxing. His brother, Steven gets meningitis and one of the bullies takes his sweatshirt from him after he recognizes it as his own. When Frank's dog loses in a fight, he threatens Tim, who tells Frank he hates him and wants to live with his mother, but it is revealed that she is in jail. When Tim's brother Steven returns from the hospital, Tim is surprised that he is in a wheelchair. Tim learns to box, and as revenge, he punches the older bully in a showdown. When Muhammad Ali speaks to Tim, it is Tess who helps him say the words. Tim later confronts Frank telling him that he has to look after him and Steven, and that things have to change. Andrew says that the guardian angels will be watching him and the children. Guest stars: Alexis Cruz, Muhammad Ali and Christopher Marquette
115	25	"Hearts"	Victor Lobl	Susan Cridland Wick & R.J. Colleary	May 16, 1999	525	20.39
A teenager named Ilena needs a heart and while another woman, Angela McConnell, is dying, her husband Dan refuses to accept it and refuses to give his consent. In the hopes of lifting her spirits, Monica introduces Angela to Casey, Dr. Sandra's daughter. Andrew asks Angela what she wants and contrary to her wishes, the husband does not look at her donor card. Later, Casey goes to Boise to try to convince Angela's husband to donate her heart, and Tess encourages Casey to forgive Mr. McConnell. When she arrives back in Portland, Casey and her mother Dr. Sandra Pena argue and there is an accident, which causes Casey to suffer severe head trauma. When Dan McConnell finally gives his consent, it is too late. Ilena has died, but it turns out that Angela's heart has gone to another needy individual. Guest stars: Jena Malone, Christina Vidal, Maria Conchita Alonso and Travis Tritt
116	26	"Godspeed"	Tim Van Patten	Glenn Berenbeim	May 23, 1999	526	18.10
Tess meets a female astronaut, who is not scared of anything and does not believe in God, but must learn to trust God and not her skill when her tether cable becomes loose and communications to Mission Control are cut. Guest stars: Brian McNamara, Hayden Panettiere, Dr. Sally Ride and Sherry Stringfield
