= Three Blind Mice (2003 film) =

- Directed by: Mathias Ledoux
- Starring: Edward Furlong; Emilia Fox; Chiwetel Ejiofor
- Release date: 21 June 2003 (MFF)
- Running time: 1h 33min
- Countries: France; United Kingdom
- Language: English

Three Blind Mice is a 2003 British and French crime film directed by Mathias Ledoux and starring Edward Furlong, Emilia Fox and Chiwetel Ejiofor.

== Plot ==
A computer specialist witnesses the murder of his online friend through her webcam. Though he is unaware of her actual name or location, he becomes a suspect when her body is found in Amsterdam.

== Cast ==
- Edward Furlong - Thomas Cross
- Emilia Fox - Claire Bligh
- Chiwetel Ejiofor - Mark Hayward
- Sara Stewart - Thomas's Boss
- Gary Connery - The Pizza Delivery Man
- Elsa Zylberstein - Nathalie
- Valérie Decobert-Koretzky - Cathy
- Ben Miles - Lindsey
- Philip Whitchurch - Carlin
- Peter Wight - Tomlinson
- Craig Kelly - Frank
