= The Blood Oranges (film) =

- Directed by: Philip Haas
- Written by: Philip Haas and Belinda Haas (screenplay)
- Based on: John Hawkes (novel) - The Blood Oranges (1970)
- Starring: Sheryl Lee; Charles Dance; Laila Robins; Rachael Bella; Aida López
- Music by: Angelo Badalamenti
- Release date: 1997
- Running time: 93 minutes
- Country: United States
- Language: English

The Blood Oranges is a 1997 erotic drama film directed by Philip Haas and starring Sheryl Lee, Charles Dance, Laila Robins, Rachael Bella, and Aida López. It is based on the 1970 erotic cult novel The Blood Oranges by John Hawkes.

== Plot ==
Two western couples, one with children, come together in the fictional Mediterranean village of Ilyria, and explore the perils of swinging between married couples

== Cast ==
- Sheryl Lee as Fiona
- Charles Dance as Cyril
- Colin Lane as Hugh
- Laila Robins as Catherine
- Rachael Bella as Meredith
- Aida López as Rosella

== Critical reception ==
Variety wrote in its review of the film, "The sexual politics and dialogue of "The Blood Oranges," Philip Haas' screen version of John Hawkes' erotic novel, are so out of tune with the zeitgeist of the 1990s that they result in feelings of discomfort --- and unintentional laughter --- as was evident at the recent Toronto festival screenings."
