= This Is Not a Movie (2010 film) =

- Film poster
- Directed by: Olallo Rubio
- Written by: Olallo Rubio
- Produced by: Antonio Reyes; Jose Nacif; Jose Antonio O'Farrill; Olallo Rubio
- Starring: Edward Furlong
- Cinematography: Juan Jose Saravia
- Edited by: Olallo Rubio; Max Blasquez; Abraham Neme
- Music by: Slash
- Production company: Kung Fu Films
- Release date: October 21, 2010 (MIFF)
- Running time: 99 minutes
- Country: Mexico
- Language: English
- Budget: $3 million

This Is Not a Movie is a 2010 Mexican experimental science fiction comedy written and directed by Olallo Rubio. It stars Edward Furlong in three roles, playing different personalities of the same character, who prepares for the end of the world by sequestering himself in a Las Vegas hotel while he grapples with existential questions. The score was composed by musician Slash. It premiered at the Morelia International Film Festival in 2010 and was released in Mexico on January 28, 2011.

== Plot ==
Concerned that he cannot remember his past, Pete Nelson prepares for the end of the world by going to Las Vegas. In his hotel room, three distinct personalities emerge and argue with each other over the nature of reality and how to best spend the remaining time. The first personality, a bitter man who blames his failed life on "the system", wants to explore his forgotten past. The second personality, a drunken hedonist, wants to leave the hotel and take advantage of the prostitution and gambling in Las Vegas. A third personality, which emerges after debates between the first two, questions the nature of reality and states that they are all fictional characters in the screenplay of a hack writer.

Eventually, a ghost appears, whom Pete identifies as Jimmy, a friend who died years ago. Jimmy points out plot holes in the film, including the fact that he can perceive each of the three personalities. With this evidence, Pete's personalities become more convinced that they are in a film, though they also debate the idea that the whole situation is a dream, which the third personality decries as further evidence that the writer is a hack. Nelson experiences a series of hallucinations or dreams in the form of parodic short films and trailers laced with conspiracy theories. One lampoons the Apple "think different" ad campaign and states that anyone who actually thinks differently is assassinated. Another posits a cabal of world leaders and businessmen who control the world through a company called Propaganda. Films like Empire Strikes Back, The Texas Chain Saw Massacre, The Delta Force, Leaving Las Vegas, and The Holy Mountain are spoofed, mentioned or referenced. There is a scene where Pete confronts the audience (and himself) by breaking the fourth wall and threatening to kill the camera.

The first personality tires of the other two personalities and shoots both. Jimmy's ghost then shoots him, but Pete does not die. Instead, the CEO of Propaganda reappears as a disembodied voice and guides Pete to place where they can talk face-to-face. There, the man reveals himself as a former CIA agent and the screenwriter who created Pete. Depressed about his lack of success in finishing the screenplay, the writer explains that he has become suicidal and threatens to kill himself, which was the source of the apocalypse in Pete's world. The writer berates Pete for derailing the writing process and taking over the character. Pete is unable to talk the writer out his course of action, and the film ends as the writer shoots himself in the head.

== Cast ==
- Edward Furlong as Pete Nelson
- Peter Coyote as Master of Propaganda / The Writer
- Edi Gathegi as Ghost of Jimmy

== Production ==
The film was shot in Mexico City and Las Vegas and was produced from 2003 to 2008 with a budget of $3 million. Slash scored the film, and it features songs by Monster Magnet. The deleted scenes available in the Blu-ray edition include an animated sequence where Alice Cooper plays on the soundtrack.

== Release ==
This Is Not a Movie premiered at the Morelia International Film Festival and was released in Mexico on January 28, 2011. Lorber released it on DVD and Blu-ray in the United States on March 20, 2012.

== Reception ==
Luis Tovar of Mexican newspaper La Jornada wrote that the film "is a terrific con-job that allows the filmmaker to, among other things, navigate convincingly between fantasy and reality". Howard Feinstein of Screen Daily wrote that the themes are "all wrong for a film" and "go nowhere". Harry H. Long of the Lebanon Daily News said the film's themes are unclear and scattershot, but the film is "masterfully done" and features a "tour-de-force performance" from Furlong. Jamie S. Rich of DVD Talk rated it 0.5/5 stars and wrote that although the film is not poorly made, the writing is shallow and immature. Devon Ashby of CraveOnline rated it 2.5/10 stars and wrote that it "[fails] to compensate for its lack of superficial content with convincing thematic resonance or formal commentary".
