= Olallo Rubio =

Mexican filmmaker and broadcaster

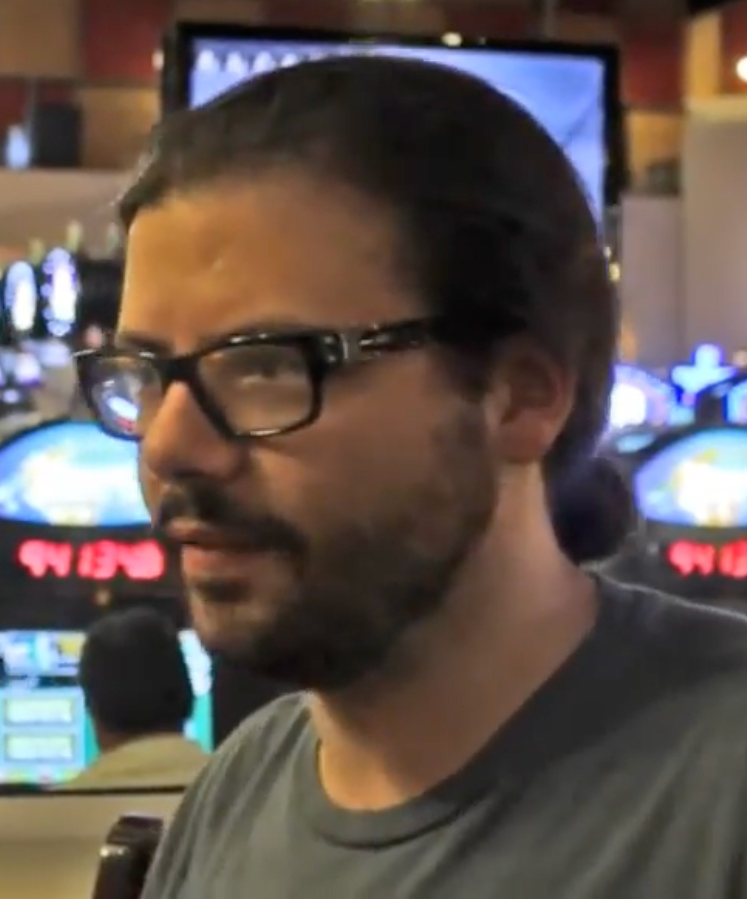
- Rubio in 2012
- Born: 3 June 1976 (age 50); Mexico
- Occupations: Broadcaster; filmmaker
- Years active: 1975–present

Olallo Rubio Maauad (born 3 June 1976) is a Mexican filmmaker and broadcaster. He is known for his documentaries So, What's Your Price?, Gimme the Power and Ilusión Nacional, and the feature film This Is Not a Movie

== Career ==
Rubio's career began in radio at XHDL-FM. His first film, So, What's Your Price?, a documentary film critical of consumerism, premiered at the 2007 Guadalajara International Film Festival. His next film, This Is Not a Movie, stars Edward Furlong as a man who grapples with existential questions during the end of the world. It premiered at the Morelia International Film Festival in 2010 and had a budget of $3 million. Gimme the Power, released just before the 2012 Mexican general election, is a rockumentary about the Mexican band Molotov that is also critical of Mexican politics. His latest film, released in 2014 just prior to the 2014 FIFA World Cup, is Ilusión Nacional, a documentary about football in Mexico.

== Filmography ==
- So, What's Your Price? (2007)
- This Is Not a Movie (2010)
- Gimme the Power (2012)
- Ilusión Nacional (2014)
