= Rachael Bella =

American paralegal and former actress

- Born: Vermillion, South Dakota, U.S.
- Other names: Rachael Kneeland, Rachael Zvagelsky
- Occupations: Paralegal; Actress
- Years active: 1993–2007
- Spouses: Edward Furlong (m. 2006; div. 2014) Ron Zvagelsky (m. 2014)
- Children: 3

Rachael Bella Zvagelsky, known professionally as Rachael Bella, is an American paralegal and former actress.

== Career ==
Bella is best known for her role as Becca Kotler in the movie The Ring. She has also appeared in Law & Order: Special Victims Unit, Buffy the Vampire Slayer, Boston Public and Tru Calling and The Crucible.

She retired from acting in 2007. She now works as a paralegal and law office assistant.

== Personal life ==
Bella married fellow-actor Edward Furlong on April 19, 2006. The couple met in 2004, when filming Jimmy and Judy together. She gave birth to their son in September 2006. On July 8, 2009, Bella filed for divorce citing irreconcilable differences. She alleged in court documents, filed in 2012, that their son had tested positive for cocaine, which led a judge to rule that Furlong's parental visits with their son had to be supervised. In May 2013, she obtained a restraining order against Furlong, alleging domestic violence. Furlong pleaded no contest. She retained parental custody of their son until he turned 18 in September 2024.

She married Ron Zvagelsky on July 30, 2014. They have two children together, in addition to her son with Furlong.

== Filmography ==
=== Film ===
Year	Title	Role
1993	When Pigs Fly	Ruthie
1993	Household Saints	Young Teresa Santangelo
1995	A Little Princess	Betsy
1996	The Crucible	Betty Parris
1997	The Blood Oranges	Meredith
2002	The Ring	Rebecca "Becca" Kotler
2005	American Gun	Haille
2006	Jimmy and Judy	Judy
2006	High Hopes	Lindsey
2007	Drive-Thru	Starfire

=== Television ===
Year	Title	Role	Notes
1993	Love, Honor & Obey: The Last Mafia Marriage	Young Gigi	TV film
1994	Grace Under Fire	Little Girl	"Grace and Beauty"
1994	ER	Sarah Gasner	"Into That Good Night"
1995	W.E.I.R.D. World	Suzie	TV film
1997	The Devil's Child	Young Nikki	TV film
2001	The Practice	Lisa Matthews	"Poor Richard's Almanac"
2002	Buffy the Vampire Slayer	Dead Girl	"Lessons"
2002	Law & Order: Special Victims Unit	Jackie Landricks	"Resilience"
2003	Tru Calling	Jen De Luca	"Star Crossed"
2004	Boston Public	Ditto	"Chapter 80"
