= Promised Land (1996 TV series) =

American drama television series (1996–1999)

- Genre: Drama
- Created by: Martha Williamson
- Starring: Gerald McRaney; Wendy Phillips; Austin O'Brien; Sarah Schaub; Eddie Karr; Celeste Holm
- Theme music composer: Marc Lichtman
- Composers: John Batdorf; Ray Colcord
- Country of origin: United States
- Original language: English
- No. of seasons: 3
- No. of episodes: 69 (list of episodes)

Production
- Executive producers: Steven Phillip Smith; Martha Williamson
- Producers: Jon Andersen; Danna Doyle; David Ehrman; Arnold Margolin; William Schmidt; William A. Schwartz; Debbie Smith; Robert J. Visciglia Jr. E. F. Wallengren
- Camera setup: Film; Single-camera
- Running time: 45–48 minutes
- Production companies: Moon Water Productions; CBS Productions

Original release
- Network: CBS
- Release: September 17, 1996 – May 20, 1999

Related
- Touched by an Angel

Promised Land is an American drama television series that aired on CBS from September 17, 1996, to May 20, 1999. It is a spin-off from another series, Touched by an Angel. The series was cancelled after its third season, spanning a total of sixty-nine episodes.

== Plot ==
Promised Land had an ensemble cast, which featured Russell Greene (Gerald McRaney) who was on a divine mission. In the premiere episode, which aired as a special episode of Touched by an Angel, angels Tess (Della Reese) and Monica (Roma Downey) asked Russell, recently laid off from his factory job, to "redefine what it means to be a good neighbor and recapture the American dream." To do this, Russell and his family traveled around the country in a beat up Airstream trailer, helping people in need, looking for work, and learning from their experiences.

Russell's family included his wife Claire (Wendy Phillips), who was licensed to homeschool their kids while they were on the road; his mother Hattie (Celeste Holm), who updated a hand-embroidered map to show all places they had traveled; teenage son Josh (Austin O'Brien); daughter Dinah (Sarah Schaub); and young nephew Nathaniel (Eddie Karr), who had been abandoned by Russell's troubled brother Joe (Richard Thomas). Erasmus was an old friend of the family who lived in Chickory Creek, the small town in Kentucky where Hattie grew up. The family frequently returned to Chickory Creek to celebrate holidays and to rest. Occasionally they were assisted by Tess or other angels while they tried to help people overcome their personal problems or rekindle their lapsed faith.

Early in the second season, Claire found out that she was pregnant, but their infant daughter, Grace, died soon after her birth in the season's final episode. In the third season, the family decided to settle down and moved into a run-down small house in a poor neighborhood in Denver, Colorado. Russell convinced the owner to let them live there rent free in exchange for the renovations he made to the house. Claire got a job as a guidance counselor at the local high school, where Josh and Dinah enrolled as students. Russell volunteered at the Ridley Center, a neighborhood teen center. Living next door to the Greenes in Denver were Shamaya and her teenage brother L.T., a former gang member who was struggling with trying to go straight. Josh's girlfriend was Bobbie, an unwed mother with an infant son, and Dinah had a friend named Margot, who enjoyed the 1940s era and its fashions in particular. In the series' final episode, Hattie married an old friend of the family and Russell quit the Ridley Center to take a job as a police officer.

Most of the third season was spent in Denver, Colorado, but—much like Touched by an Angel—it was filmed in Salt Lake City, Utah.

== Cast ==
=== Main ===
- Gerald McRaney as Russell Greene
- Wendy Phillips as Claire Greene
- Austin O'Brien as Josh Greene
- Sarah Schaub as Dinah Greene
- Celeste Holm as Hattie Greene
- Eddie Karr as Nathaniel Greene
- Eugene Byrd as Lawrence "L.T." Taggert Jr. (season 3)
- Kathryne Dora Brown as Shamaya Taggert (season 3)
- Michael Flynn as Principal Vincent Peters (season 3)
- Tinsley Grimes as Bobbie Wagner (season 3)
- Ashleigh Norman as Margot Noteworthy (season 3)

=== Recurring ===
- Ossie Davis as Erasmus Jones
- Suzzanne Douglas as Dr. Rebecca Dixon (seasons 1–2)
- Kamar de los Reyes as Leon Flores (season 3)
- Della Reese as Tess
- John Dye as Andrew
- Richard Thomas as Joe Greene
- Roma Downey as Monica

== Episodes ==
Season	Episodes	Originally released	
Season	Episodes	First released	Last released
1	24	September 17, 1996	May 20, 1997
2	23	September 25, 1997	May 14, 1998
3	22	October 1, 1998	May 20, 1999

== Production ==
The pilot episode was filmed in the spring of 1996 by the crew of Touched by an Angel at the conclusion of production of the latter's second season. The pilot episode took place primarily in the fictional town of Chickory Creek, Kentucky but the actual location was Springville, Utah.

Because Touched by an Angel continued production for a third season, a new crew was hired for production of the Promised Land series. In the meantime, parts of the pilot episode were re-written and two characters from the original pilot episode were recast. Originally, the part of Hattie Greene was played by Peg Phillips. Celeste Holm replaced her in the cast. The part of Nathaniel Greene was also recast with Eddie Karr playing the role in the new version of the pilot and throughout the series. The newly hired crew of Promised Land spent six days reshooting portions of the pilot episode in July 1996.

The storyline of the series called for the Greene family to travel throughout the United States, so northern Utah served as a stand-in for many states. As was the case with Touched by an Angel, the crew's filming locations were usually within a two-hour drive from downtown Salt Lake City. However, during each of the first two seasons, three episodes were filmed in and around Saint George, Utah. During the third season, three episodes were filmed in and around Natchez, Mississippi (in August and September 1998).

== Cancellation ==
After the show's third season in 1999, the show was cancelled by CBS due to low ratings and not the controversial school shooting episode "A Day in the Life" scheduled to air two days after the Columbine shooting. According to then CBS president, Nancy Tellem, she states the following on the show's cancellation: "We were looking at it to see how it was growing, as we normally do with all our shows, and, unfortunately, it wasn't growing. And, as much as we tried to change the emphasis—instead of it being a Winnebago going across the country we placed it in an urban setting—it just wasn't performing."

The last episode, simply titled "Finale" aired on May 20, 1999. The characters of the Greene family were never seen or mentioned again on the parent show Touched by an Angel which continued on for four more years, ending in 2003. Recurring actor Ossie Davis returned to the show on a recurring basis, but not as his Erasmus Jones character, but instead playing an angel named Gabriel.

== Broadcast ==
The series aired Tuesdays at 8:00 pm (EST) on CBS for its first season and Thursdays at 8:00 pm (EST) for the rest of its run.

== Home media ==
In May 2018, Visual Entertainment released Promised Land: The Complete Collection on DVD in Region 1. There are 69 total episodes of the series, but due to the Season 3 episode: "A Day in the Life" being pulled from its original airing, the set only states that there's 68 episodes. The omitted episode however is still included, but as a bonus episode.

== Awards and nominations ==
Year	Award	Result	Category	Recipient
1997	Young Artist Award	Nominated	Best Performance in a TV Comedy/Drama - Supporting Young Actor Age Ten or Under	Eddie Karr
1997	Young Artist Award	Nominated	Best Performance in a Drama Series - Young Actress	Sarah Schaub
1997	Young Artist Award	Nominated	Best Performance in a Drama Series - Young Actor	Austin O'Brien
1997	Young Artist Award	Nominated	Best Family TV Drama Series	-
1997	Young Artist Award	Won	Best Performance in a Drama Series - Guest Starring Young Actor	Benjamin Salisbury
1998	Young Artist Award	Nominated	Best Performance in a TV Drama Series - Leading Young Actor	Eddie Karr
1998	Young Artist Award	Won	Best Performance in a TV Drama Series - Leading Young Actress	Sarah Schaub (Tied with Beverley Mitchell for 7th Heaven)
1998	Young Artist Award	Won	Best Performance in a TV Drama Series - Leading Young Actor	Austin O'Brien (Tied with Michael Yarmush for My Life as a Dog)
1998	Young Artist Award	Won	Best Performance in a TV Drama Series - Guest Starring Young Actor	Trever O'Brien
1998	Young Artist Award	Won	Best Family TV Drama Series	- (Tied with 7th Heaven)
1999	Young Artist Award	Nominated	Best Performance in a TV Drama Series - Guest Starring Young Actor	Zach Hopkins
1999	Young Artist Award	Won	Best Performance in a TV Series - Young Ensemble	Eddie Karr, Austin O'Brien, and Sarah Schaub
1999	Young Artist Award	Won	Best Family TV Drama Series	-
2000	Young Artist Award	Nominated	Best Performance in a TV Drama Series - Leading Young Actress	Sarah Schaub
2000	Young Artist Award	Won	Best Performance in a TV Drama Series - Leading Young Actor	Austin O'Brien
1997	PGA Awards	Won	Most Promising Producer in Television	Martha Williamson
1998	Emmy Award	Won	Outstanding Guest Actress in a Drama Series	Cloris Leachman (For episode "Mooster's Revenge")
1998	YoungStar Award	Nominated	Best Performance by a Young Actor in a Drama TV Series	Austin O'Brien
1999	YoungStar Award	Nominated	Best Performance by a Young Actor in a Drama TV Series	Austin O'Brien
1999	NAACP Image Awards	Won	Outstanding Supporting Actress in a Drama Series	Ruby Dee (For a guest star or recurring role)
1999	NAACP Image Awards	Won	Outstanding Supporting Actor in a Drama Series	Ossie Davis
