= Chema Rodríguez (filmmaker) =

Spanish filmmaker and writer

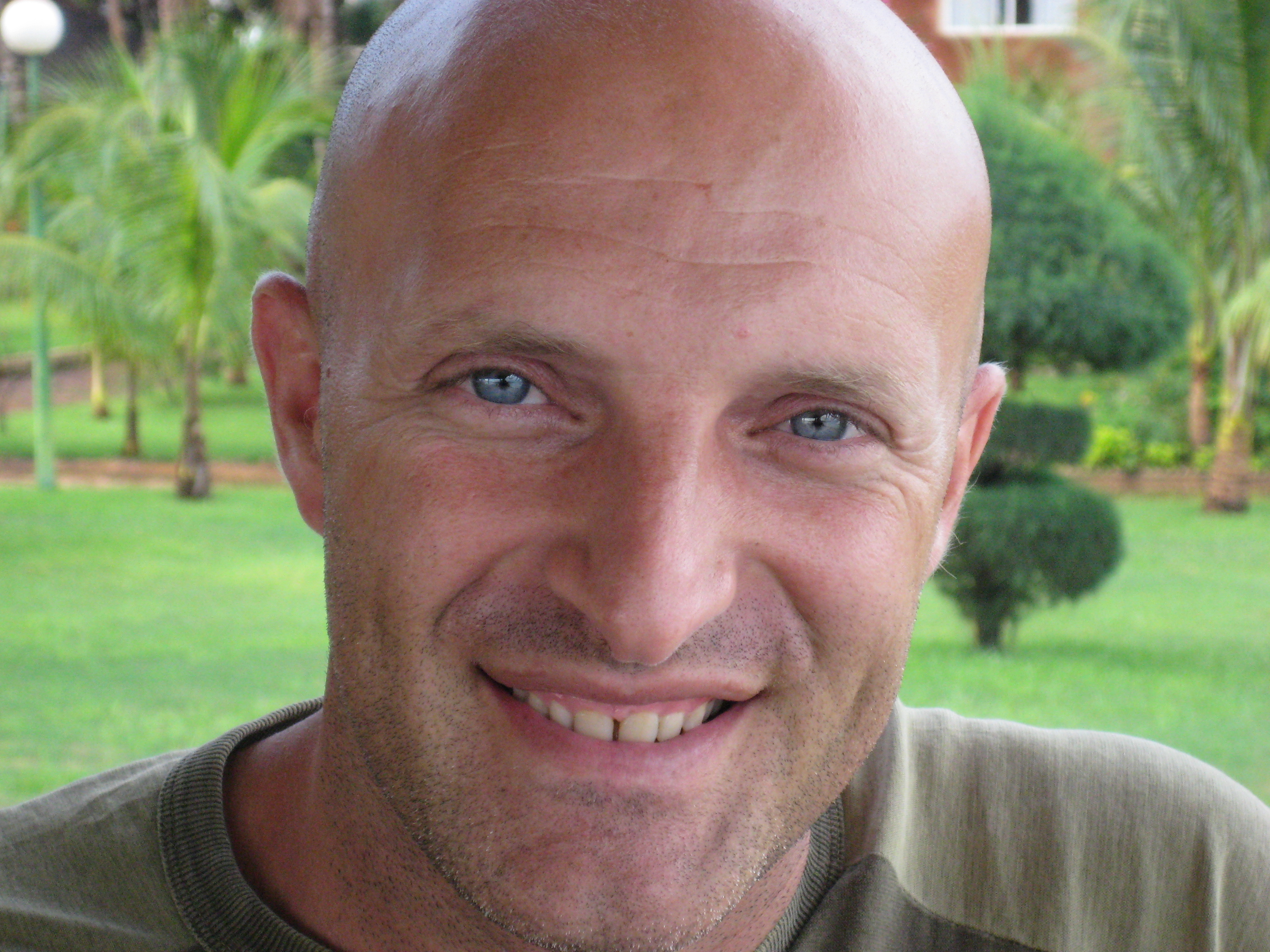
- Occupations: Director, scriptwriter

Chema Rodríguez (Sevilla, Spain, 1967) is a Spanish filmmaker and writer.

== Travel and creation ==
Chema Rodríguez has written the books El diente de la ballena (El País Aguilar, 1999) and Anochece en Katmandú (RBA, 2003).

As director and scriptwriter he has contributed multipart documentaries broadcast in TVE, GeoPlaneta and diverse international channels, with series such as Sahel, la frontera herida (1999), El barco de Ulises (2001), La llamada de África (2003), Vivir en el agua (2005) or Latidos (2008).

== Filmography ==
In his film career, he is mainly known as director, writer and producer of the full-length documentary Estrellas de la Línea (The Railroad All Stars), which took part in the Panorama section of the Berlinale ([Second Audience Award, Berlinale Panorama 2006 ]; Jury Special Mention, Málaga Film Festival 2006(in Spanish); Sebastián Prize, San Sebastián Film Festival 2006; Audience Award, LAFF Utrecht 2007, as well as a dozen other awards at international film festivals). The film has participated in the official section of diverse festivals around the world: Karlovy Vary, Hot docs-Toronto, Silver Docs-Washington, Montreal, Edinburgh, Warsaw, Hamburg, Chicago, Miami or Tokio.

He repeated at the Panorama section of the Berlinale in 2009, with his full-length documentary Coyote: Jury Second Prize, Documenta Madrid 2009; Jury First Prize and Audience Award, LAFF Utrecht 2009(in Spanish), and also awarded at the WorldFest Houston International Film Festival 2010(in Spanish).

Director, screenplay writer and producer of the documentary short films Amor callejero (Street Love) and Triste Borracha (Sad Drunk; Jury First Prize, Documenta Madrid 2009) He also wrote the screenplay for the feature film La gran final (The Great Match) (Special Official Section, Berlinale 2006).

Scriptwriter and director of the TV movie Maras (2010, Antena 3, Spanish television) and the full-length documentary El Abrazo de los Peces (2011) (The Embrace of the Fishes).

Director, scriptwriter and producer of Nightfall in India (2014), a feature fiction film that is an international co-production. Nightfall in India has got the awards for Best Actor and Best Editing at Málaga Film Festival 2014. Also, it was nominee for Best Adapted Screenplay at the Goya Awards 2015. Currently, he is preparing his second feature film, also an international coproduction: Giants don't Exist.
