= Gimme the Power (2012 film) =

- Film poster
- Directed by: Olallo Rubio
- Written by: Olallo Rubio
- Produced by: Olallo Rubio; Jose Nacif
- Starring: Molotov
- Narrated by: Olallo Rubio
- Cinematography: Jose Casillas
- Edited by: Abraham Neme; Juan Fontana Rosas
- Music by: Javier Umpierrez
- Production company: Amateur Films
- Release date: June 1, 2012
- Running time: 101 minutes
- Country: Mexico
- Language: Spanish

Gimme the Power is a 2012 Mexican documentary film by Olallo Rubio about the band Molotov.

== Synopsis ==
Olallo Rubio traces the history of the Mexican rock band Molotov and their wider significance to Mexican politics. Further, the film explains how Mexican rock music has always had a rather ambiguous relationship with the Mexican government and society in general since the late 1950s, and it reviews the Avandaro Festival's La Onda hippie generation until modern times.

== Cast ==
- Sergio Arau
- Olallo Rubio
- Juan Villoro
- Fernanda Tapia
- Molotov: Tito Fuentes, Miky Huidobro, Paco Ayala, and Randy Ebright
- Luis de Llano Macedo
- Alex Lora
- Armando Molina S.

== Production ==
Rubio had wanted to do a rockumentary for a long time and was inspired to direct one after he saw the band perform in Spain in 2003. He said that he hoped the film would inspire young people to be more critical of the government.

== Release ==
Gimme the Power was released in Mexico on June 1, 2012, timed to appear just before the general election.

== Reception ==
According to El Universal, the film was received well in Mexico.
