= Sarah Schaub =

American actress

- Born: Sarah Schaub; June 13, 1983 (age 43); Salt Lake City, Utah, U.S.
- Occupation: Actress
- Years active: 1989–present
- Spouse: Alex Lowe
- Children: 3

Sarah Schaub (born June 13, 1983) is an American actress from Salt Lake City, Utah.

She has appeared in such productions as Stephen King's The Stand and A Home of Our Own with Kathy Bates. She is best known for playing Dinah Greene in the CBS drama Promised Land from 1996 to 1999, for which she garnered two Young Artist Awards for Best Performance in a TV Drama Series-Leading Young Actress (1998) and Best Performance in a TV Drama Series-Young Ensemble (1999). After the series ended, Schaub acted primarily in local theater.

== Filmography ==
Film and television
| Year | Title | Role | Notes |
|---|---|---|---|
| 1989 | Willy the Sparrow | Tanya | |
| 1991 | In Your Wildest Dreams | Katie Andrews | |
| 1993 | A Home of Our Own | Faye Lacey | |
| 1994 | Noctropolis | Courier | Video game |
| 1994 | The Stand | Gina McCone | TV miniseries |
| 1995 | The Avenging Angel | Annie Rigby | TV movie |
| 1995 | Just Like Dad | Lilly | TV movie |
| 1995 | Nothing Lasts Forever | (uncredited) | TV movie |
| 1995 | One West Waikiki | Sarah Cole | Episode: "Past Due" |
| 1996 | Touched by an Angel | Dinah Greene | Episode: "Promised Land" |
| 1996 | Home of the Brave | Dinah Greene | TV movie |
| 1996–1999 | Promised Land | Dinah Greene | 67 episodes |
| 1997 | Touched by an Angel | Dinah Greene | Episode: "The Road Home: Part 1"; Episode: "Amazing Grace: Part 2" |
| 1998 | Touched by an Angel | Dinah Greene | Episode: "Vengeance Is Mine: Part 1" |
| 1999 | Heaven or Vegas | Paige | |
| 2004 | See You in My Dreams | Liza | TV movie |
| 2008 | Going Home | Shelly | Short film |
