= 15th Youth in Film Awards =

1994 edition of American awards program

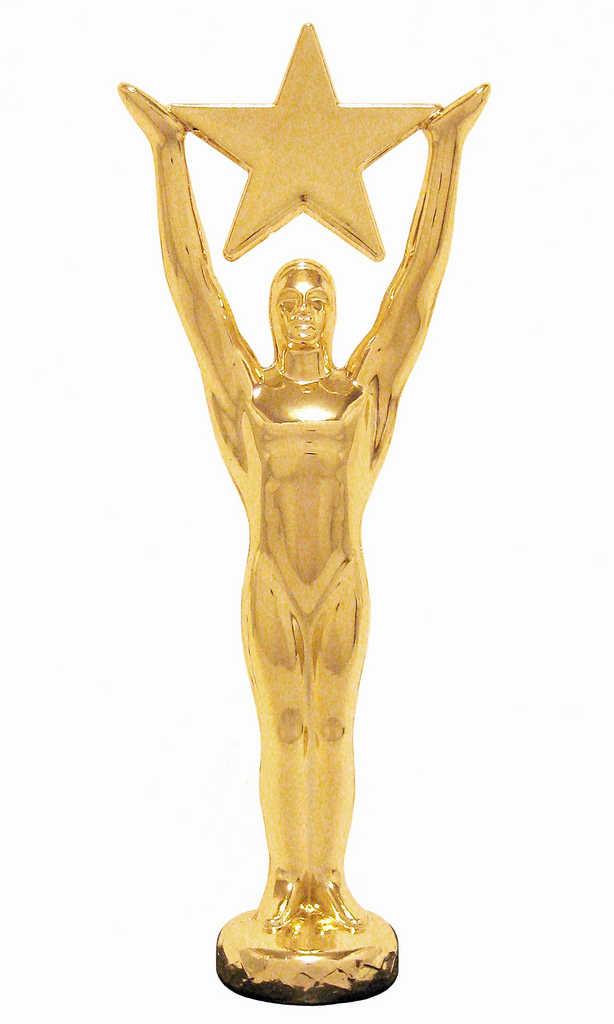
- Awarded for: Achievement in the 1992—1993
- Date: February 5, 1994
- Site: Sportsmen's Lodge; Studio City, California
- Hosted by: Melissa Joan Hart

The 15th Youth in Film Awards ceremony (now known as the Young Artist Awards), presented by the Youth in Film Association, honored outstanding youth performers under the age of 21 in the fields of film, television and theatre for the 1992-1993 season, and took place on February 5, 1994, at the Sportsmen's Lodge in Studio City, California.

Established in 1978 by long-standing Hollywood Foreign Press Association member, Maureen Dragone, the Youth in Film Association was the first organization to establish an awards ceremony specifically set to recognize and award the contributions of performers under the age of 21 in the fields of film, television, theater and music.

== Categories ==
★ Bold indicates the winner in each category.

== Best Young Performer in a Motion Picture ==
=== Best Youth Actor Leading Role in a Motion Picture: Drama ===
★ (tie) Edward Furlong - A Home of Our Own (Gramercy Pictures) as Shayne Lacey
★ (tie) Jason James Richter - Free Willy (Warner Bros) as Jesse

- Jesse Bradford - King of the Hill (Universal Pictures) as Aaron
- Andrew Knott - The Secret Garden (Warner Bros) as Dickon Sowerby
- Austin O'Brien - Last Action Hero (Columbia Pictures) as Danny Madigan
- Ernie Reyes, Jr. - Surf Ninjas (New Line Cinema) as Johnny
- Heydon Prowse - The Secret Garden (Warner Bros) as Colin Craven
- Robert J. Steinmiller Jr. - Jack the Bear (20th Century Fox) as Jack Leary

=== Best Youth Actress Leading Role in a Motion Picture: Drama ===
★ Ariana Richards - Jurassic Park (Universal Pictures) as Lex Murphy

- Clarissa Lassig - A Home of Our Own (Gramercy Pictures) as Lynn Lacey
- Kate Maberly - The Secret Garden (Warner Bros) as Mary Lennox
- Remy Ryan - RoboCop 3 (Orion Pictures) as Nikko Halloran
- Alicia Silverstone - The Crush (Warner Bros) as Adrian/Darian Forrester

=== Best Youth Actor Leading Role in a Motion Picture: Comedy ===
★ Mason Gamble - Dennis the Menace (Warner Bros) as Dennis Mitchell

- David Krumholtz - Life with Mikey (Touchstone Pictures) as Barry Corman
- Omri Katz - Hocus Pocus (Walt Disney Pictures) as Max Dennison
- Sean Murray - Hocus Pocus (Walt Disney Pictures) as Thackery Binx
- David Netter - One Good Cop (Hollywood Pictures)
- Michael Oliver - Problem Child 2 (Universal Pictures) as Junior Healy

=== Best Youth Actress Leading Role in a Motion Picture: Comedy ===
★ (tie) Thora Birch - Hocus Pocus (Walt Disney Pictures) as Dani Dennison
★ (tie) Christina Vidal - Life with Mikey (Touchstone Pictures) as Angie Vega

- Amy Sakasitz - Dennis the Menace (Warner Bros) as Margaret Wade
- Vinessa Shaw - Hocus Pocus (Walt Disney Pictures) as Allison Watts
- Madeline Zima - Mr. Nanny (New Line Cinema) as Kate Mason
- Senta Moses - Home Alone 2: Lost in New York (20th Century Fox) as Tracy McCallister

=== Best Youth Actor Co-Starring in a Motion Picture: Drama ===
★ Joseph Mazzello - Jurassic Park (Universal Pictures) as Tim Murphy

- Francis Capra - A Bronx Tale (Savoy Pictures) as Calogero (Age 9)
- Jason London - Dazed and Confused (Gramercy Pictures) as Randall "Pink" Floyd
- Tzvi Ratner Stauber - Family Prayers (Earthquake Productions) as Andrew Jacobs
- Nick Stahl - The Man Without a Face (Warner Bros) as Charles E. "Chuck" Norstadt

=== Best Youth Actress Co-Starring in a Motion Picture: Drama ===
★ Reese Witherspoon - Jack the Bear (20th Century Fox) as Karen Morris

- Amber Benson - King of the Hill (Universal Pictures) as Ella McShane
- Gaby Hoffmann - The Man Without a Face (Warner Bros) as Megan Norstadt
- Rae'Ven Kelly - What's Love Got to Do with It (Touchstone) as Young Anna Mae
- Irene Ng - The Joy Luck Club (Hollywood Pictures) as Lindo Jong (Age 15)

=== Best Youth Actor Under 10 in a Motion Picture ===
★ Ross Malinger - Sleepless in Seattle (TriStar) as Jonah Baldwin

- Cameron Boyd - King of the Hill (Universal Pictures) as Sullivan
- David Gallagher - Look Who's Talking Now (TriStar) as Mikey Ubraccio
- Norman D. Golden II - Cop and a Half (Universal Pictures) as Devon Butler
- Eric Lloyd - Heart and Souls (Universal Pictures) as Thomas Reilly (Age 7)
- Max Pomeranc - Searching for Bobby Fischer (Paramount) as Josh Waitzkin

=== Best Youth Actress Under 10 in a Motion Picture ===
★ Melanie Chang - The Joy Luck Club (Hollywood Pictures) as June Woo (Age 9)

- Tabitha Lupien - Look Who's Talking Now (TriStar) as Julie Ubriacco
- Mai Vu - The Joy Luck Club (Hollywood Pictures) as Waverly Jong (Age 6-9)
- Julianne Michelle - Family Prayers (Earthquake Productions) as Fay Jacobs
- Ivyann Schwan - Problem Child 2 (Universal Pictures) as Trixie Young
- Shannon Hughes - Honey, I Blew Up the Kid (Walt Disney Pictures)

== Best Young Performer in a TV Movie, Mini-Series or Special ==
=== Best Youth Actor in a TV Mini-Series, Movie of the Week, or Special ===
★ Benjamin Brazier - Heidi (Disney) as Peter

- Derek Baxter - The Man from Left Field (CBS) as Malcolm
- Adam Cronan - The Man from Left Field (CBS) as Bama Block
- Jonathan Hernandez - They've Taken Our Children: The Chowchilla Kidnapping (ABC) as Ricardo Alanzo
- Miko Hughes - Big Boys Don't Cry (CBS) as Andy Walters
- David Lascher - The Flood: Who Will Save Our Children (NBC) as Brad Jamison
- Mario Lopez - Big Boys Don't Cry (CBS) as Ray Sanchez
- Cory Miller - Commander Toad in Space (ABC) as Jack
- Eric Pospisil - Other Women's Children (Lifetime) as Alexander Stewart
- Shawn Toovey - The Fire Next Time (CBS) as Jake Morgan

=== Best Youth Actress in a TV Mini-Series, Movie of the Week, or Special ===
★ Mary-Kate and Ashley Olsen - Double, Double, Toil and Trouble (ABC) as Kelly Farmer/Young Sophia and Lynn Farmer/Young Agatha

- Nancy Moore Atchison - They (Showtime) as Nikki Samuels
- Melissa Clayton - A Child Lost Forever: The Jerry Sherwood Story (NBC) as Dawn
- Molly Orr - A Message from Holly (CBS) as Jenny
- Lexi Randall - Heidi (Disney) as Klara Sesemann
- Brooke Stanley - Big Boys Don't Cry (CBS) as April Walters
- Noley Thornton - Heidi (Disney) as Heidi
- Sabrina Wiener - Miracle on Interstate 880 (NBC) as Cathy Beruman

== Best Young Performer in a Television Series ==
=== Best Youth Actor Leading Role in a Television Series ===
★ Jonathan Brandis - seaQuest DSV (NBC) as Lucas Wolenczak

- Justin Burnette - Hearts Afire (CBS) as Ben Hartman
- Jeremy Jackson - Baywatch (Syndicated) as Hobie Buchannon
- Scott McAfee - Home Free (ABC) as Lucas Bailey
- Jason Marsden - Almost Home (NBC) as Gregory Morgan
- Sean Murray - Harts of the West (CBS) as Zane Grey Hart
- Ben Savage - Boy Meets World (ABC) as Cory Matthews
- Josiah Trager - Big Brother Jake (Family Channel) as Loomis "Lou" Washington
- Daniel Steven Gonzalez - Land of the Lost (ABC) as Simon Cardenas

=== Best Youth Actress Leading Role in a Television Series ===
★ Rae'Ven Kelly - I'll Fly Away (NBC) as Adlaine Harper

- Nicole Eggert - Baywatch (Syndicated) as Summer Quinn
- Erika Flores - Dr. Quinn, Medicine Woman (CBS) as Colleen Cooper
- Angela Goethals - Phenom (ABC) as Angela Doolan
- Meghann Haldeman - Harts of the West (CBS) as L'Amour Hart
- Anndi McAfee - Home Free (ABC) as Abby Bailey
- Ashleigh Blair Sterling - Getting By (ABC) as Julie Dixon
- Nicholle Tom - The Nanny (CBS) as Maggie Sheffield
- Catherine Wu - Big Brother Jake (Family Channel)
- Melissa Joan Hart - Clarissa Explains It All (Nickelodeon) as Clarissa Marie Darling

=== Best Youth Comedian ===
★ Johnny Galecki - Roseanne (ABC) as David Healy

- Zachary Bostrom - Harry and the Hendersons (Syndicated) as Ernie Henderson
- Doug E. Doug - Where I Live (ABC) as Douglas St. Martin
- Raushan Hammond - America's Funniest People (ABC)
- Isaac Lidsky - Saved by the Bell: The New Class (NBC) as Barton "Weasel" Wyzell
- Rider Strong - Boy Meets World (ABC) as Shawn Hunter

=== Best Youth Comedienne ===
★ Jenna von Oÿ - Blossom (NBC) as Blossom Ruby Russo

- Tatyana M. Ali - The Fresh Prince of Bel-Air (NBC) as Ashley Banks
- Olivia Burnette - Almost Home (NBC) as Dorothy Jane Torkelson
- Staci Keanan - Step by Step (ABC) as Dana Foster
- Ashlee Levitch - Family Album (CBS) as Nicki Lerner
- Raven-Symoné - Hangin' With Mr. Cooper (ABC) as Nicole Lee

=== Best Youth Actor Recurring or Regular in a TV Series ===
★ Adam Wylie - Picket Fences (CBS) as Zachary Brock

- Kenny Blank - Tall Hopes (CBS) as Ernest Harris
- Jeffrey Bomberger - Daddy Dearest (FOX) as Danny Mitchell
- Ryan Francis - Sisters (NBC) as Trevor Whitsig
- Omar Gooding - Hangin' with Mr. Cooper (ABC) as Earvin Rodman

=== Best Youth Actress Recurring or Regular in a TV Series ===
★ Sabrina Wiener - Cheers (NBC) as Lucinda Tortelli

- Lackey Bevis - Running the Halls (NBC) as Molloy Simpson
- Kimberly Cullum - Against the Grain (NBC) as Tanya
- Yunoka Doyle - Where I Live (ABC) as Sharon St. Martin
- Lexi Randall - Designing Women (CBS) as Randa Oliver

=== Best Youth Actor in a Soap Opera ===
★ Tommy Michaels - All My Children (ABC) as Timmy Hunter

- John Alden - The Young and the Restless (CBS) as Nicholas "Nick" Newman
- Bryan Buffington - Guiding Light (CBS) as Bill Lewis III
- Gregory Burke - Guiding Light (CBS) as Ben Reade
- Glenn Harris - General Hospital (ABC) as Sly Eckert
- Chris McKenna - One Life to Live (ABC) as Joey Buchanan
- Erik von Detten - Days of Our Lives (NBC) as Nicholas Alamain
- Paul Walker - The Young and the Restless (CBS) as Brandon Collins

=== Best Youth Actress in a Soap Opera ===
★ Rachel Miner - Guiding Light (CBS) as Michelle Bauer

- Sarah Michelle Gellar - All My Children (ABC) as Kendall Hart
- Melissa J. Hayden - Guiding Light (CBS) as Bridget Reardon
- Lindsay Price - All My Children (ABC) as An Li Chen Bodine
- Alison Sweeney - Days of Our Lives (NBC) as Sami Brady
- Heather Tom - The Young and the Restless (CBS) as Victoria Newman
- Erin Torpey - One Life to Live (ABC) as Jessica Buchanan

=== Best Youth Actor Guest-Starring in a Television Show ===
★ Adam Wylie - The Adventures of Brisco County, Jr. (FOX) as Charlie Sims

- J.D. Daniels - Full House (ABC) as Charles
- Karl David-Djerf - Picket Fences (CBS) as Boy #1
- Raushan Hammond - Tales from the Crypt (HBO) as Danny
- Danny Hart - Key West (FOX)

=== Best Youth Actress Guest-Starring in a Television Show ===
★ Courtney Peldon - Lois & Clark: The New Adventures of Superman (ABC) as Amy Valdez

- Vanessa Lee Evigan - Jack's Place (ABC) as Nicole Pierson
- Anndi McAfee - Baywatch (Syndicated) as Lauren Taylor
- Nicole Rodgers - America's Most Wanted (FOX)
- Sabrina Wiener - Beverly Hills, 90210 (FOX) as Little Girl

=== Best Youth Actor Under 10 in a Television Series or Show ===
★ (tie) Jonathan Hernandez - General Hospital (ABC)
★ (tie) Shawn Toovey - Dr. Quinn, Medicine Woman (CBS) as Brian Cooper

- Erin Davis - The Sinbad Show (FOX) as Zana Beckley
- Sam Gifaldi - The Mommies (NBC) as Danny Kellogg
- Scott Groff - Days of Our Lives (NBC) as Shawn Douglas Brady
- Courtland Mead - The Young and the Restless (CBS) as Phillip Chancellor IV
- Jacob Parker - Evening Shade (CBS) as Will Newton
- Shane Sweet - Married... with Children (FOX) as Seven
- Nathan Watt - Harts of the West (CBS) as John Wayne "Duke" Hart

=== Best Youth Actress Under 10 in a Television Series or Show ===
★ (tie) Ashley Johnson - Phenom (ABC) as Mary Margaret Doolan
★ (tie) Ashley Peldon - Shameful Secrets (ABC) as Josie Tate

- Karla Green - Tall Hopes (CBS) as DeeDee Harris
- Lily Nicksay - Boy Meets World (ABC) as Morgan Matthews
- Kyla Pratt - A Matter of Justice (NBC) as Christine
- Heather Ramsay - Unsolved Mysteries (NBC)
- Alexa Vega - Evening Shade (CBS) as Emily Newton
- Davida Williams - Hangin' With Mr. Cooper (ABC) as Sarah

== Best Young Performer in a Voice Over Role ==
=== Best Youth Actor in a Voice-Over Role: TV or Movie ===
★ Adam Wylie - All-New Dennis the Menace (CBS) as Dennis Mitchell

- Chris Allport - Recycle Rex (Disney Channel) as Edsel the Dinosaur
- Jason Marsden - Hocus Pocus (Walt Disney Pictures) as Thackery Binx (Cat)
- Scott McAfee - Batman: The Animated Series (FOX) as Chris Carlyle
- Joshua Wiener - Back to the Future: The Animated Series (CBS) as Jules Brown

=== Best Youth Actress in a Voice-Over Role: TV or Movie ===
★ Anndi McAfee - Tom and Jerry: The Movie (Miramax) as Robyn Starling

- Megan Pryor - Recycle Rex (Disney Channel)
- Francesca Smith - Itsy Bitsy Spider (USA Network) as Leslie McGroarty

== Best Young Host in a Television Show ==
=== Outstanding Youth Host in a TV Magazine, News, or Variety Show ===
★ Mario Lopez - Name Your Adventure (NBC)

- Savion Glover - Sesame Street (PBS)
- Gary Goldstein - Real News for Kids
- Jenn Harris - Real News for Kids

== Best Young Ensemble Performance ==
=== Outstanding Youth Ensemble in a Television Series ===
★ Home Improvement (ABC) - Zachery Ty Bryan as Bradley Michael "Brad" Taylor, Taran Noah Smith as Mark Taylor, and Jonathan Taylor Thomas as Randall William "Randy" Taylor

- Thea (ABC) - Brenden Jefferson as James Turrell, Adam Jeffries as Jarvis Turrell Jr., Brandy Norwood as Danesha Turrell, and Jason Weaver as Jerome Turrell
- Step by Step (ABC) - Josh Byrne as Brendan Lambert, Christopher Castile as Mark Foster, Staci Keanan as Dana Foster, Christine Lakin as Alicia "Al" Lambert, and Angela Watson as Karen Foster
- The Mommies (NBC) - Sam Gifaldi as Danny Kellogg, Ryan Merriman as Blake Kellogg, Ashley Peldon as Kasey Larson, Shiloh Strong as Adam Larson, and Joey Zimmerman as Kevin
- Picket Fences (CBS) - Holly Marie Combs as Kimberly Brock, Justin Shenkarow as Matthew Brock, and Adam Wylie as Zachary Brock
- The Nanny (CBS) - Benjamin Salisbury as Brighton Sheffield, Nicholle Tom as Maggie Sheffield, and Madeline Zima as Gracie Sheffield

=== Outstanding Youth Ensemble in a Cable or Off-Prime Time Series ===
★ Kids Incorporated (Disney Channel) - Eric Balfour, Nicole Brown, Jared Delgin, Kenny Ford, Love Hewitt, Anastasia Horne, and Haylie Johnson

- Roundhouse (Nickelodeon) - Jennifer Cahi, Alfred Carr Jr., John Crane, Mark David, Shawn Daywalt, Ivan Dudynsky, Micki Duran, Amy Ehrlich, Seymour Willis Green Jr., Natalie Nucci, Julene Renee, and David Sidoni
- California Dreams (NBC) - Michael Cade as Sylvester Leslie "Sly" Winkle, Jay Anthony Franke as Jacob Samuel "Jake" Sommers, Brent Gore as Matt Garrison, William James Jones as Antoine Bethesda "Tony" Wicks, Kelly Packard as Tiffani Anne Smith, and Ryan O'Neill as Dennis Garrison
- Saved by the Bell: The New Class (NBC) - Jonathan Angel as Tommy De Luca, Natalia Cigliuti as Lindsay Warner, Isaac Lidsky as Barton "Weasel" Wyzell, Bonnie Russavage as Vicki Needleman, and Robert Sutherland Telfer as Scott Erickson

=== Outstanding Youth Ensemble in a Motion Picture ===
★ The Sandlot (20th Century Fox) - Brandon Quintin Adams as Kenny DeNunez, Victor DiMattia as Timmy Timmons, Grant Gelt as Bertram Grover Weeks, Tom Guiry as Scott "Scotty" Smalls, Chauncey Leopardi as Michael "Squints" Palledorous, Shane Obedzinski as Tommy "Repeat" Timmons, Patrick Renna as Hamilton "Ham" Porter, Mike Vitar as Benjamin Franklin "Benny" Rodriguez, and Marty York as Alan "Yeah-Yeah" McClennan

- A Home of Our Own (Gramercy Pictures) - Miles Feulner as Murray Lacey, Edward Furlong as Shayne Lacey, Clarissa Lassig as Lynn Lacey, Amy Sakasitz as Annie Lacey, and Sarah Schaub as Faye Lacey
- Swing Kids (Hollywood Pictures) - Christian Bale as Thomas Berger, Robert Sean Leonard as Peter Müller, David Tom as Willi, and Frank Whaley as Arvid

== Best Young Performer in Live Theatre ==
=== Best Youth Actor in Live Theatre ===
★ J. D. Daniels - Conversations with My Father (Los Angeles)

- Grant Gelt - Lost in Yonkers (Chicago)
- Timothy Hibbard - Just So Stories
- Jonathan Charles Kaplan - Falsettos
- Jimmy Madio - The Godson
- Joshua Miller - Orestes
- Joshua Wiener - Lost in Yonkers (Los Angeles)

=== Best Youth Actress in Live Theatre ===
★ Soleil Moon Frye - Orestes

- Jessica Anthony - Just So Stories
- Lindsey Haun - Snoopy
- Anastasia Horne - Children in the Street

== Best Family Entertainment ==
=== Outstanding Youth Mini-Video Series ===
★ Karate for Kids (Bright Ideas Productions) - Brandon Gaines, Erika Nenekervis, Terri Tseng, Niven Shan, and Joshua Walker

- Secret Adventures (ep. #1 "Spin") (Taweel-Loos & Co.) - Marcus Andrews as Bobby Wilson, Tamara Daniels as Andrea 'Drea' Thomas, Frankie Ingrassia as Marcy Manmington, Heidi Lucas as Kimberly Andow, Sarah Martineck as Rebecca Long, Michael MacLeod as Matt Long, Marne Patterson as Arlene Blake, and Chris Wilson as George Easton
- The Girl's Club (Phillips POV) - Heidi Lucas
- The New Adventures of McGee and Me (ep. #10 "In the Nick of Time") (Taweel-Loos & Co.) - Joe Dammann as Nicholas "Nick" Martin, Sarah Dammann as Sarah Martin, Chelsea Hertford as Jamie Martin, Whitby Hertford as Phillip Monroe, and Shaylisa Hurte as Renee Johnson

=== Outstanding Family TV Special, Movie of the Week, or Mini-Series ===
★ Heidi (Disney Channel)

- A Matter of Justice (NBC)
- A Message From Holly (CBS)
- Miracle on Interstate 880 (NBC)
- They (Showtime)
- The Bulkin Trail (Family Channel)

=== Best New Television Series ===
★ Dr. Quinn, Medicine Woman (CBS)

- Boy Meets World (ABC)
- Hangin' With Mr. Cooper (ABC)
- Phenom (ABC)
- Saved by the Bell: The College Years (NBC)
- The Nanny (CBS)

=== Outstanding Family Motion Picture: Action/Adventure ===
★ Jurassic Park (Universal Pictures)

- The Nightmare Before Christmas (Buena Vista)
- Rudy (TriStar)

=== Outstanding Family Motion Picture: Comedy ===
★ Sleepless in Seattle (TriStar)

- Cool Runnings (Buena Vista)
- Life with Mikey (Touchstone)
- Look Who's Talking Now (TriStar)
- Robin Hood: Men in Tights (20th Century Fox)

=== Outstanding Family Motion Picture: Drama ===
★ Free Willy (Warner Bros)

- A Home of Our Own (Gramercy Pictures)
- King of the Hill (Universal Pictures)
- The Man Without a Face (Warner Bros)
- Searching for Bobby Fischer (Paramount)
- The Secret Garden (Warner Bros)

== Youth In Film's Special Awards ==
=== The Jackie Coogan Award ===
==== Outstanding Contribution to Youth Through Motion Pictures ====
★ Steven Spielberg

=== The Michael Landon Award ===
==== Outstanding Contribution to Youth Through Television ====
★ Merv Griffin - Jeopardy! and Wheel of Fortune

=== Former Child Star - Life Achievement Award ===
★ Shelley Fabares - The Donna Reed Show as Mary Stone
★ Jimmy Hawkins - It's A Wonderful Life as Tommy Bailey

=== Most Promising New Youth Actress ===
★ Christina Vidal - Life with Mikey as Angie Vega

=== The Music Award of Merit ===
★ Gail Purse - Producer for Disney's Young Musicians Symphony Orchestra

=== Family Classic Award ===
★ Al Burton - Producer of The New Lassie Series

=== Outstanding Dissemination of News for Kids Through Radio ===
★ Radio AAHS Program - Bill Barnett, President

=== Outstanding Youth Actors in a Family Foreign Film ===
★ Ruaidhri Conroy as Tito and Ciarán Fitzgerald as Ossie (Ireland) - Into the West

=== Outstanding Family Foreign Film ===
★ Into the West (Ireland) - Directed by Mike Newell
