= 16th Youth in Film Awards =

1995 US media awards ceremony

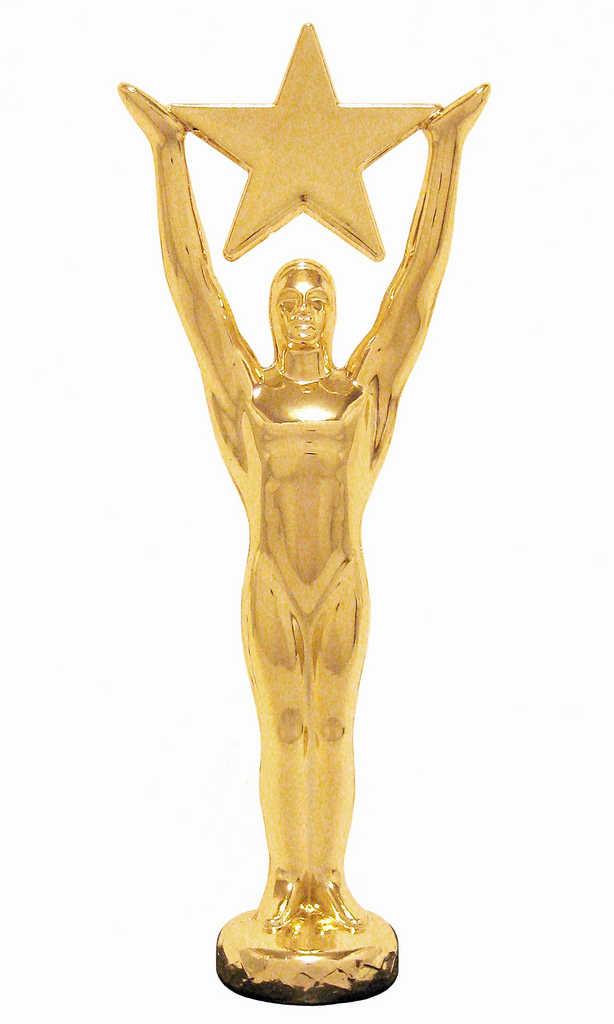
- Awarded for: Achievement in the 1993—1994 season
- Date: March 19, 1995
- Site: Sportsmen's Lodge; Studio City, California
- Hosted by: Jason Marsden and Will Friedle

The 16th Youth in Film Awards ceremony (now known as the Young Artist Awards), presented by the Youth in Film Association, honored outstanding youth performers under the age of 21 in the fields of film, television, theater and music for the 1993–1994 season, and took place on March 19, 1995, at the Sportsmen's Lodge in Studio City, California.

Established in 1978 by long-standing Hollywood Foreign Press Association member, Maureen Dragone, the Youth in Film Association was the first organization to establish an awards ceremony specifically set to recognize and award the contributions of performers under the age of 21 in the fields of film, television, theater and music.

== Categories ==
★ Bold indicates the winner in each category.

== Best Young Performer in a Motion Picture ==
=== Best Performance by a Youth Actor Starring in a Motion Picture ===
★ Brad Renfro - The Client (Warner Bros. Pictures) as Marcus "Mark" Sway

- Elijah Wood - North (Columbia Pictures) as North
- Sean Nelson - Fresh (Miramax Films) as Michael "Fresh"
- Austin O'Brien - My Girl 2 (Columbia Pictures) as Nick Zsigmond

=== Best Performance by a Youth Actress Starring in a Motion Picture ===
★ Anna Chlumsky - My Girl 2 (Columbia Pictures) as Vada Sultenfuss

- Natalie Portman - Léon: The Professional (Gaumont Buena Vista International) as Mathilda Lando
- Kate Winslet - Heavenly Creatures (Miramax) as Juliet Hulme
- Katherine Heigl - My Father the Hero (Touchstone Pictures) as Nicole Arnel
- Alana Austin - A Simple Twist of Fate (Touchstone Pictures) as Mathilda McCann (age 10)
- Zelda Harris - Crooklyn (Universal Pictures) as Troy

=== Best Performance by a Youth Actor Co-Starring in a Motion Picture ===
★ Matthew McCurley - North (Columbia Pictures) as Winchell

- Michael Conner Humphreys - Forrest Gump (Paramount Pictures) as Young Forrest Gump
- Eric Lloyd - The Santa Clause (Walt Disney Pictures) as Charlie Calvin
- Max Elliott Slade - 3 Ninjas Kick Back (TriStar Pictures) as Jeffrey "Colt" Douglas
- Roland Thomson - My Girl 2 (Columbia Pictures) as Kevin Phillips
- Sean Fox - 3 Ninjas Kick Back (TriStar Pictures) as Samuel "Rocky" Douglas Jr.
- Matthew Lawrence - Mrs. Doubtfire (20th Century Fox) as Chris Hilliard

=== Best Performance by a Youth Actress Co-Starring in a Motion Picture ===
★ Kirsten Dunst - Little Women (Columbia Pictures) as Younger Amy March

- Lisa Jakub - Mrs. Doubtfire (20th Century Fox) as Lydia Hilliard
- Anna Klemp - Blue Sky (Orion Pictures) as Becky Marshall
- Amy Locane - Blue Sky (Orion Pictures) as Alex Marshall
- Lexi Randall - The War (Universal Pictures) as Lidia Joanne Simmons
- Claire Danes - Little Women (Columbia Pictures) as Elizabeth 'Beth' March
- Michelle Williams - Lassie (Paramount) as April Porter

=== Best Performance by an Actor Under 10 in a Motion Picture ===
★ Haley Joel Osment - Forrest Gump (Paramount) as Forrest Gump Jr.

- Courtland Mead - Corrina, Corrina (New Line Cinema) as Howard
- J. Evan Bonifant - 3 Ninjas Kick Back (TriStar Pictures) as Michael "Tum-Tum" Douglas
- Milton A. Davis - Angels in the Outfield (Walt Disney) as J.P.

=== Best Performance by an Actress Under 10 in a Motion Picture ===
★ Hanna Hall - Forrest Gump (Paramount) as Young Jenny Curran

- Whittni Wright - I'll Do Anything (Columbia Pictures) as Jeannie Hobbs
- Alyssa Austin - A Simple Twist of Fate (Touchstone) as Mathilda McCann (age 5)
- Tina Majorino - Andre (Paramount) as Toni Whitney
- Madeline Zima - Mr. Nanny (New Line Cinema) as Kate Mason

== Best Young Performer in a Film Made for Video ==
=== Best Performance by a Youth Actor in a Film Made for Video ===
★ Courtland Mead - Dragonworld (Paramount) as Young Johnny McGowan

- Michael MacLeod - Secret Adventures (Taweel-Loos and Company) as Matt Long
- Chris Wilson - Secret Adventures (Taweel-Loos and Company) as George Easton
- Marcus Andrews - Secret Adventures (Taweel-Loos and Company) as Bobby Wilson

=== Best Performance by a Youth Actress in a Film Made for Video ===
★ Marne Patterson - Secret Adventures (Taweel-Loos and Company) as Arlene Blake

- Heidi Lucas - Secret Adventures (Taweel-Loos and Company) as Kimberly Andow
- Frankie Ingrassia - Secret Adventures (Taweel-Loos and Company) as Marcy Manmington
- Tamara Daniels - Secret Adventures (Taweel-Loos and Company) as Andrea 'Drea' Thomas
- Sarah Martineck - Secret Adventures (Taweel-Loos and Company) as Rebecca Long

== Best Young Performer in a TV Mini-Series or Special ==
=== Best Performance by a Youth Actor in a TV Mini-Series or Special ===
★ Wil Horneff - The Yearling (CBS) as Jody Baxter

- Mark-Paul Gosselaar - Saved by the Bell: Wedding in Las Vegas (NBC) as Zachary "Zack" Morris
- Jonathan Hoog - Someone Else's Child (ABC) as Christopher Maddox
- Jonathan Brandis - Good King Wenceslas (Family Channel) as Prince Wenceslas
- Eric Lloyd - Seasons of the Heart (NBC) as David
- Sam Gifaldi - Where Are My Children (ABC) as David (Age 8)
- Bradley Pierce - Ride with the Wind (ABC) as Danny Barnes

=== Best Performance by a Youth Actress in a TV Mini-Series or Special ===
★ Rae'Ven Larrymore Kelly - Lily in Winter (USA Network) as Louetta Covington

- Courtney Chase - Reunion (CBS) as Meggie Yates
- Ashley Malinger - To My Daughter with Love (ABC) as Emily Cutter
- Holly Marie Combs - A Perfect Stranger (NBC) as Amanda Hale
- Ashley Peldon - Without Warning (CBS) as Kimberly Hastings
- Olivia Burnette - The Gift of Love (CBS) as Louise

== Best Young Performer in a Television Series ==
=== Best Performance by a Youth Actor in a Drama Series ===
★ Shawn Toovey - Dr. Quinn, Medicine Woman (CBS) as Brian Cooper

- Devon Gummersall - My So-Called Life (ABC) as Brian Krakow
- Justin Shenkarow - Picket Fences (CBS) as Matthew Brock
- Adam Wylie - Picket Fences (CBS) as Zachary Brock
- Joey Zimmerman - Earth 2 (NBC) as Ulysses Adair

=== Best Performance by a Youth Actress in a Drama Series ===
★ (tie) Lisa Wilhoit - My So-Called Life (ABC) as Danielle Chase
★ (tie) J. Madison Wright - Earth 2 (NBC) as True Danziger

- Vinessa Shaw - McKenna (ABC) as Cassidy "Cass" McKenna (pilot)
- Natalie Shaw - Under Suspicion (CBS) as Shane Fusco
- Lacey Chabert - Party of Five (FOX) as Claudia Salinger
- Haylie Johnson - Dr. Quinn, Medicine Woman (CBS) as Becky Bonner

=== Best Performance by a Youth Actor in a TV Comedy Series ===
★ Michael Fishman - Roseanne (ABC) as D.J. Conner

- Andrew Keegan - Thunder Alley (ABC) as Jack Kelly
- Jason Marsden - Boy Meets World (ABC) as Jason Marsden
- Johnny Galecki - Roseanne (ABC) as David Healy
- Will Friedle - Boy Meets World (ABC) as Eric Matthews

=== Best Performance by a Youth Actress in a TV Comedy Series ===
★ Brittany Daniel and Cynthia Daniel - Sweet Valley High (Syndication) as Jessica "Jess" Wakefield and Elizabeth "Liz" Wakefield

- Courtney Peldon - The Mommies (NBC) as Beth Booker
- Larisa Oleynik - The Secret World of Alex Mack (Nickelodeon) as Alexandra "Alex" Mack
- Noley Thornton - The Martin Short Show (NBC) as Caroline Short
- Angela Watson - Step by Step (ABC) as Karen Foster
- Ashley Johnson - All American Girl (ABC) as Casey Emerson
- Tatyana M. Ali - Name Your Adventure (NBC) as Herself

=== Best Youth Comedian in a TV Show ===
★ Marques Houston - Sister, Sister (ABC) as Roger Evans

- Victor Togunde - Sister, Sister (ABC) as Steve
- Isaac Lidsky - Summertime Switch (ABC) as Numbers
- Jason Zimbler - Clarissa Explains It All (ep. "Take My Brother's Place") (Nickelodeon) as Ferguson Darling

=== Best Youth Comedienne in a TV Show ===
★ Melissa Joan Hart - Clarissa Explains It All (Nickelodeon) as Clarissa Marie Darling

- Gaby Hoffmann - Someone Like Me (NBC) as Gaby Stepjak
- Tia Mowry and Tamera Mowry - Sister, Sister (ABC) as Tia Landry and Tamera Campbell
- Andrea Barber - Full House (ABC) as Kimmy Gibbler
- Ashley Peldon - The Mommies (NBC) as Kasey Larson

=== Best Performance by a Youth Actor in a Daytime Series ===
★ Courtland Mead - The Young and the Restless (CBS) as Phillip Chancellor IV

- Bryan Buffington - Guiding Light (CBS) as Bill Lewis III
- Michael Sutton - General Hospital (ABC) as Michael "Stone" Cates
- Josh Morrow - The Young and the Restless (CBS) as Nicholas "Nick" Newman
- Bryan Dattilo - Days of Our Lives (NBC) as Lucas Roberts

=== Best Performance by a Youth Actress in a Daytime Series ===
★ Maitland Ward - The Bold and the Beautiful (CBS) as Jessica Forrester

- Erin Torpey - One Life to Live (ABC) as Jessica Buchanan
- Rachel Miner - Guiding Light (CBS) as Michelle Bauer
- Sarah Michelle Gellar - All My Children (ABC) as Kendall Hart
- Courtney Chase - One Life to Live (ABC) as Sarah Victoria 'Flash' Roberts #2

=== Best Performance by a Youth Actor - TV Guest Star ===
★ Christopher Babers - Due South (CBS) as Willie Lambert

- Raushan Hammond - Hangin' with Mr. Cooper (ABC) as Scott Farcus
- Joshua Wiener - Someone Like Me (NBC) as Doug
- Dustin Voigt - Someone Like Me (NBC) as Sean
- Gabriel Damon - Star Trek: The Next Generation (Syndication) as Jeremy Aster
- Erik Alperin - Law & Order (NBC) as Kevin Parker
- Chris Demetral - Lois & Clark: The New Adventures of Superman (ABC) as Jack
- Wil Horneff - Law & Order (NBC) as Chris Pollit
- Ross Malinger - Dr. Quinn, Medicine Woman (CBS) as Steven Myers

=== Best Performance by a Youth Actress - TV Guest Star ===
★ Rae'Ven Larrymore Kelly - Sweet Justice (NBC) as Niara

- Jackie Tohn - The Nanny (CBS) as Tiffany Koenig
- Azura Bates - Due South (CBS) as Lucy
- Vinessa Shaw - Murder, She Wrote (CBS) as Gloria Bryce
- Rachael Bella - ER (NBC) as Sarah Gasner
- Kimberly Cullum - Star Trek: The Next Generation (Syndication) as Gia
- Madeline Zima - Law & Order (NBC) as Samantha Silver
- Sabrina Wiener - Dr. Quinn, Medicine Woman (CBS) as Little Feather
- Ivyann Schwan - Bill Nye the Science Guy (PBS) as Self

=== Best Performance by an Actor Under 10 in a TV Series ===
★ Ross Bagley - The Fresh Prince of Bel-Air (NBC) as Nicholas "Nicky" Banks

- Jon Paul Steuer - Grace Under Fire (ABC) as Quentin Kelly
- Andrew Ducote - Dave's World (CBS) as Willie Barry
- Zane Carney - Dave's World (CBS) as Tommy Barry
- Jake Smollett - On Our Own (ABC) as Joe Jerrico
- Benjamin LeVert - Me and the Boys (ABC) as Andrew Tower
- Sam Gifaldi - The Mommies (NBC) as Danny Kellogg

=== Best Performance by an Actress Under 10 in a TV Series ===
★ Kaitlin Cullum - Grace Under Fire (ABC) as Elizabeth Louise "Libby" Kelly

- Yvonne Zima - ER (NBC) as Rachel Greene
- Ashley Peldon - The Mommies (NBC) as Kasey Larson
- Courtney Chase - Blossom (NBC) as Kennedy Russo
- Jurnee Smollett - On Our Own (ABC) as Jordee Jerrico
- Lindsay Felton - Thunder Alley (ABC) as Jenny Turner
- Madeline Zima - The Nanny (CBS) as Gracie Sheffield

== Best Young Performer in a Voice-Over ==
=== Best Performance by a Youth Actor in a Voice-Over - TV or Movie ===
★ Jason Weaver (duet with Laura Williams) - The Lion King (Walt Disney) as Young Simba (singing voice)

- Jonathan Taylor Thomas - The Lion King (Walt Disney) as Young Simba
- Ndehru Roberts - Whitewash (HBO) as Mauricio
- Adam Wylie - The Swan Princess (New Line Cinema) as Young Prince Derek (singing voice)
- J.D. Daniels - The Swan Princess (New Line Cinema) as Teenage Prince Derek
- Ben Diskin - Problem Child (USA Network) as Junior Healy

=== Best Performance by a Youth Actress in a Voice-Over - TV or Movie ===
★ Laura Williams (duet with Jason Weaver) - The Lion King (Walt Disney) as Young Nala (singing voice)

- Larisa Oleynik - The Swan Princess (New Line Cinema) as Pre-teen Odette
- Adrian Zahiri - The Swan Princess (New Line Cinema) as Young Princess Odette
- Alisa Nordberg - The Swan Princess (New Line Cinema) as Backing Singer
- Sabrina Wiener - Duckman (USA Network)
- Serena Henry - Whitewash (HBO) as Helene Angel
- Haven Hartman - Red Planet (FOX) as Phillis Jane "P.J." Marlowe

== Best Young Ensemble Performance ==
=== Best Performance by a Youth Ensemble in a Motion Picture ===
★ The Little Rascals (Universal Pictures) - Ross Bagley as Buckwheat, Travis Tedford as Spanky McFarland, Bug Hall as Alfalfa Switzer, Brittany Ashton Holmes as Darla, Kevin Jamal Woods as Stymie and Juliette Brewer as Mary Ann

- Little Big League (Columbia Pictures) - Luke Edwards as Billy Heywood, Billy Sullivan as Chuck and Miles Feulner as Joey
- Beethoven's 2nd (Universal Pictures) - Nicholle Tom as Ryce Newton, Christopher Castile as Ted Newton and Sarah Rose Karr as Emily Newton

=== Best Performance by a Youth Ensemble in a Television Series ===
★ My So-Called Life (ABC) - Claire Danes as Angela Chase, Wilson Cruz as Enrique "Rickie" Vasquez, Devon Gummersall as Brian Krakow, A.J. Langer as Rayanne Graff, Devon Odessa as Sharon Cherski and Lisa Wilhoit as Danielle Chase

- The Nanny (ABC) - Nicholle Tom as Maggie Sheffield, Benjamin Salisbury as Brighton Sheffield and Madeline Zima as Grace Sheffield
- Kids Incorporated (Disney Channel) - Nicole Brown, Anthony Harrell, Haylie Johnson, Anastasia Horne, Dena Burton, Charlie Brady and Thomas Guiry

== Best Family Entertainment ==
=== Best New Family Television Series ===
★ My So-Called Life (ABC)

- Sister, Sister (ABC)
- Earth 2 (NBC)
- The Secret World of Alex Mack (Nickelodeon)
- Me and the Boys (ABC)

=== Best Family TV Movie Pilot or Special ===
★ Saved by the Bell: Wedding in Las Vegas (NBC)

- Good King Wenceslas (The Family Channel)
- A Perfect Stranger (NBC)
- Lily in Winter (USA Network)

=== Best Family Film Made for Video ===
★ Dragonworld (Paramount)

- Secret Adventures: Snap (Taweel-Loos and Company)
- Enchanted Tales (Animated Family Classics/Golden Films)
- Secret Adventures: Snag (Taweel-Loos and Company)

=== Best Family Motion Picture: Comedy or Musical ===
★ The Lion King (Walt Disney)

- Beethoven's 2nd (Universal Pictures)
- Mrs. Doubtfire (20th Century Fox)
- Sister Act 2: Back in the Habit (Buena Vista)
- The Santa Clause (Walt Disney)
- North (Castle Rock)

=== Best Family Motion Picture: Drama ===
★ Lassie (Paramount)

- Andre (Paramount)
- Black Beauty (Warner Bros.)
- Crooklyn (Universal Pictures/Spike Lee Productions)
- Little Women (Columbia)
- The War (Universal Pictures)

== Youth In Film's Special Awards ==
=== The Jackie Coogan Award ===
==== Outstanding Contribution to Youth Through Motion Pictures ====
★ New Line Cinema - The Swan Princess

=== The Michael Landon Award ===
==== Outstanding Contribution to Youth Through Television ====
★ Youth Cast and Producers for Home Improvement

=== Former Child Star - Life Achievement Award ===
★ Robert Blake - Original "Little Mickey" in The Little Rascals

=== Outstanding Family Theater Production ===
★ Dana Lightstone - Chicken Soup

=== Outstanding Contribution To Youth Through Entertainment ===
★ Laura Dash - Stunt Artist For Children in Film and TV

=== Inspiration To Youth Award ===
★ Scott Cheek

=== Outstanding International Student Film Award ===
★ Vickie Oldham - The Clearing

=== International Music Award ===
★ Joselito Escobar - "Daddy Kool 'N The Raskals"

=== Outstanding Youth Actors in a Foreign Film ===
★ Daniel Guyent and Jehan Pagès - Poussières de vie (Dust of Life) as Son and Petit Haï

=== Outstanding Family Foreign Film ===
★ Shiro and Marilyn (Japan)
