= Charlie Brown Christmas Special =

Charlie Brown Christmas Special can refer to:

- A Charlie Brown Christmas (1965)
- It's Christmastime Again, Charlie Brown (1992)
- Charlie Brown's Christmas Tales (2002)
- I Want a Dog for Christmas, Charlie Brown (2003)
