= Marnette Patterson =

American actress (born 1980)

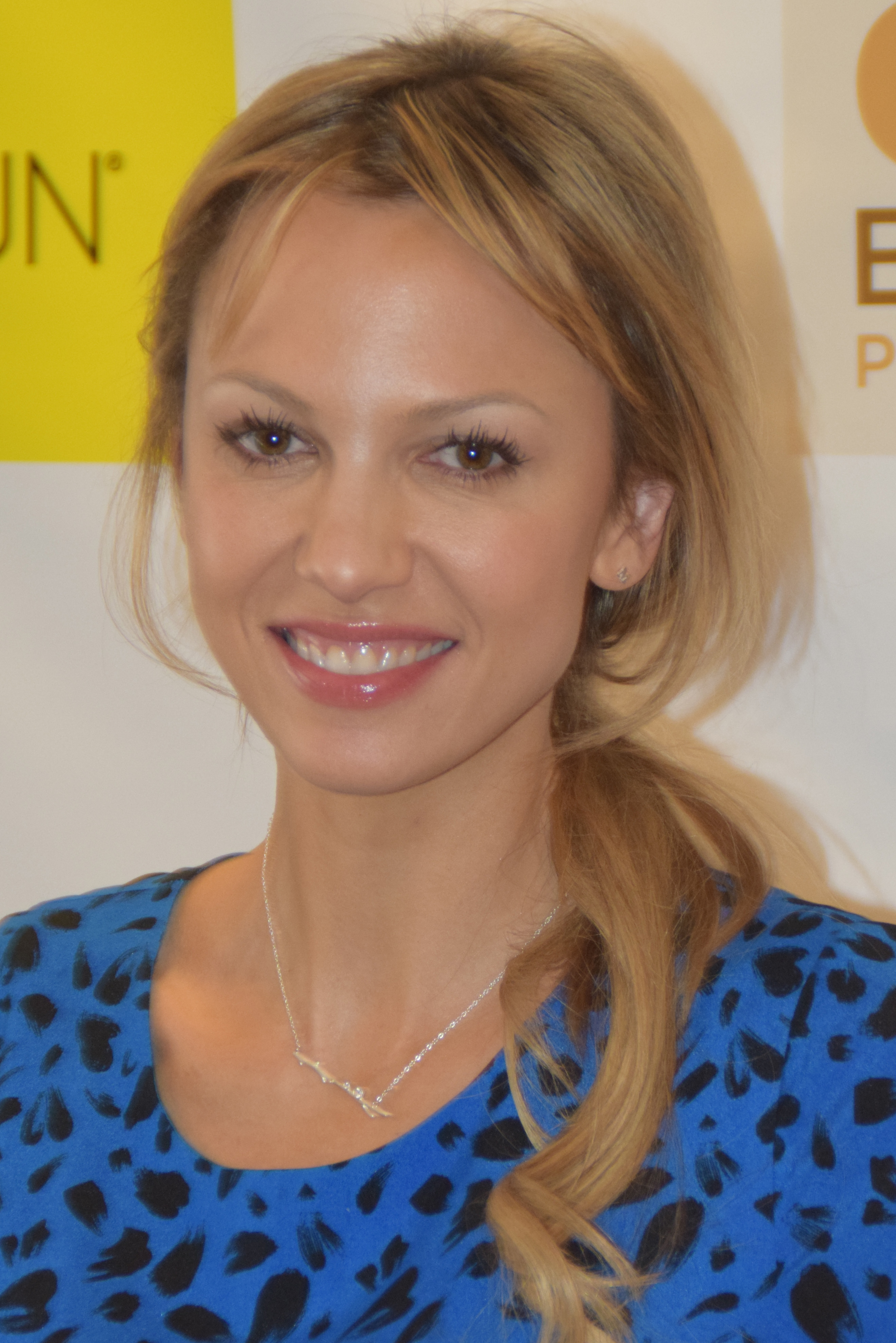
- Patterson in 2015
- Born: Marnette Provost Patterson; April 26, 1980 (age 46)
- Occupation: Actress
- Years active: 1986–present
- Children: 2

Marnette "Marne" Provost Patterson (born April 26, 1980) is an American actress best known for her role as Christy Jenkins in the final season of the television series Charmed. She has also appeared in multiple films such as A Nightmare on Elm Street 5: The Dream Child, Starship Troopers 3: Marauder, and Wild Things: Foursome. Additionally, she has had guest roles in various television series such as CSI: Crime Scene Investigation, Supernatural, and House.

== Career ==
Patterson has appeared in films such as Camp Nowhere (1994). In 1996, Patterson appeared briefly as a volleyball schoolgirl attracting the attentions of Tommy in the premiere episode of 3rd Rock from the Sun. From 1996–1998 Patterson portrayed Nicole Farrell on the NBC and later ABC series Something So Right. Patterson starred in the short-lived WB sitcom Movie Stars and the made-for-TV movie The Stalking of Laurie Show. Patterson made an appearance in That '70s Show as Shelly in the episode: "Eric's Panties" in 2000. Who's Your Daddy? (2003), Pope Dreams (2005), and Cloud 9 (2005). She also voiced Lucy van Pelt in It's Christmastime Again, Charlie Brown and It's Spring Training, Charlie Brown. In 2004, Patterson appeared on Grounded for Life as an underage drinker. In 2005, she guest starred on Supernatural as a high school student, Charlie, in the episode "Bloody Mary".

In 2006, Patterson landed the role of Christy Jenkins on the eighth and final season of Charmed. Her character was a witch who was kidnapped by demons as a child and had been held captive in The Underworld for many years. Her sister, Billie Jenkins, played by Kaley Cuoco, sought help of the Charmed ones to rescue Christy.

Patterson also portrayed Holly Little in the 2008 film Starship Troopers 3: Marauder. She then starred as Maggie Schaffer on the web series, called LG15: The Resistance. In 2009, she appeared on an episode of the TV series House, as the character Ashley. In 2011, she appeared briefly on an episode of The Mentalist ("Every Rose Has Its Thorn") as a con artist who would sleep with wealthy men and then blackmail them. Her character was named Naomi/Victoria. Patterson is close friends with Jennifer Finnigan, her co-star on The Stalking of Laurie Show.

== Filmography ==
=== Film ===
Year	Title	Role	Notes
1989	A Nightmare on Elm Street 5: The Dream Child	Little Girl	
1990	The Kingdom Chums: Original Top Ten	Annie	Voice role; direct-to-video film
1993	Sliver	Joanie Ballinger	
1994	Camp Nowhere	Trish Prescott	
1996	Sweet Evil	Jenny (young)	
2002	Clover Bend	Claire	
2002	Who's Your Daddy?	Brittany Van Horn	Direct-to-video film
2005	Standing Still	Sarah	
2006	Cloud 9	Crystal	
2006	Pope Dreams	Brady Rossman	
2006	The Standard	Gina	
2007	Ghosts of Goldfield	Julie	Direct-to-video film
2007	Remember the Daze	Stacey Cherry	
2007	Kush	Taylor	
2008	Starship Troopers 3: Marauder	Holly Little	Direct-to-video film
2009	The Beacon	Christina Wade	
2010	Wild Things: Foursome	Rachel Thomas	Direct-to-video film
2014	American Sniper	Sarah	
2018	Concrete Kids	Janice	
2020	Think Like a Dog	Cindy	

=== Television ===
Year	Title	Role	Notes
1986	Mama's Family	Dorrie	Episode: "Santa Mama"
1990	Good Grief	Little Girl	Episode: "Cub Scouts & Horses & Whiskers on Kittens"
1991	Under Cover	Emily Del'Amico	Main role
1992	It's Christmastime Again, Charlie Brown	Lucy Van Pelt / Frieda	Voice role; TV film
1992	It's Spring Training, Charlie Brown	Lucy Van Pelt	Voice role; TV short
1993–1994	Secret Adventures	Arlene Blake	Video short series
1994	Boy Meets World	Allison Cheever	Episode: "Turnaround"
1995	Unhappily Ever After	Cindy Stalling	Episode: "Boxing Mr. Floppy"
1995	Something Wilder	Granddaughter	Episode: "Hanging with Mr. Cooper"
1995	Liz: The Elizabeth Taylor Story	Jane Powell	TV film
1995	The Great Mom Swap	Nicole Henderson	TV film
1995	Kirk	Amanda	Episode: "Night at the Movies"
1996	3rd Rock from the Sun	Volleyball Girl	Episode: "Brains and Eggs"
1996	Minor Adjustments	Joanna Emsen	Episodes: "Ask Dr. Ron", "The Ungrateful Dead", "Baby Boomer Angst"
1996–1998	Something So Right	Nicole Farrell	Main role
1997	Saved by the Bell: The New Class	Robyn Peterson	Episode: "Big Sister Blues"
1999	Odd Man Out	Caroline	Episode: "The Unbelievable Truth"
1999–2000	Movie Stars	Lori Lansford	Main role
2000	Touched by an Angel	Katie Sullivan	Episode: "With God as My Witness"
2000	The Stalking of Laurie Show	Michelle Lambert	TV film
2000	That '70s Show	Shelly	Episode: "Eric's Panties"
2001	Dead Last	Brandy	Episode: "Jane's Exit"
2003	Nip/Tuck	Fluffer	Episode: "Sofia Lopez"
2003	Run of the House	Jessica	Episode: "The Party"
2003	Secret Santa	Callie	TV film
2004	Cracking Up	Eve	Episode: "Birds Do It"
2005	Supernatural	Charlie	Episode: "Bloody Mary"
2005	Grounded for Life	Jenna	Episode: "Oh, What a Knight"
2006	Charmed	Christy Jenkins	Recurring role (season 8)
2006	Untitled Brad Copeland Project	Jen	TV film
2007	CSI: Crime Scene Investigation	Aimee	Episode: "Ending Happy"
2007	By Appointment Only	Angie	TV film
2008	LG15: The Resistance	Maggie Schaeffer	Episode: "A Call to Arms"
2009	House	Ashley	Episode: "Wilson"
2011	The Mentalist	Viktoria Shays	Episode: "Every Rose Has Its Thorn"
2011	Keeping Up with the Randalls	Samantha	TV film
2011	The Chamberland Sisters	Maria Chamberland	TV film
2015	Major Crimes	Donna Cochran	Episode: "Reality Check"

== Awards and nominations ==
Year	Association	Category	Work	Result
1994	Young Artist Awards	Outstanding Youth Mini-Video Series	Secret Adventures: Spin	Nominated
1995	Young Artist Awards	Best Young Performer in a Film Made for Video	Secret Adventures	Won
1997	Young Artist Awards	Best Performance in a TV Comedy: Supporting Young Actress	Something So Right	Nominated
