= Jack the Bear =

1993 film by Marshall Herskovitz

- Theatrical release poster
- Directed by: Marshall Herskovitz
- Screenplay by: Steven Zaillian
- Based on: Jack the Bear by Dan McCall
- Produced by: Bruce Gilbert; Peter Burrell
- Starring: Danny DeVito
- Cinematography: Fred Murphy
- Edited by: Steven Rosenblum
- Music by: James Horner
- Production companies: American Filmworks; Lucky Dog Productions Inc.
- Distributed by: 20th Century Fox
- Release date: April 2, 1993
- Running time: 99 minutes
- Country: United States
- Language: English
- Box office: $5.1 million

Jack the Bear is a 1993 American comedy-drama film directed by Marshall Herskovitz, written by Steven Zaillian based on the novel of the same name by Dan McCall, and starring Danny DeVito. The film is about John Leary (DeVito), a single father raising his two sons (Robert J. Steinmiller Jr. and Miko Hughes) in the 1970s San Francisco Bay Area after the death of his wife (Andrea Marcovicci).

== Plot ==
Jack Leary and his younger brother Dylan start over in Oakland, California, in 1972 following the death of their mother Elizabeth, who was killed in a car collision. The boys live with their father John, who entertains late-night horror film audiences as Midnight Shriek host-commentator "Al Gory". Even though he is a loving parent, John has a drinking problem that disrupts the smooth running of the household. Some parental duties fall to Jack, who takes Dylan to his first day of preschool.

One of the Learys' neighbors is a young man, Norman Strick, who walks with a cane due to a car accident as a teen. Norman is an anti-social neo-Nazi who feels the neighborhood is going downhill.

Jack likes his classmate Karen Morris. Jack's friend and next-door neighbor, Dexter, comes from a broken home. He resides with his grandparents and begins suffering a downward spiral after his grandmother dies. During this time he becomes acquainted with Norman. On Halloween, Norman gives Dexter a Nazi costume and approaches John to ask for a donation for a racially prejudiced candidate. During an airing of Invasion of the Body Snatchers, a drunken John interrupts the movie and mimics the racially charged beliefs of Norman while naming the candidate.

The next day, Jack is woken when Norman's golden retriever Cheyenne dies on their front lawn from poisoning. John apologizes for his actions on television while giving his condolences despite Norman refusing to shake his hand. Backlash from John's previous actions on his show jeopardizes his job and endangers Jack's relationship with Karen. Jack takes out his anger on Dylan then leaves him with Dexter. He later learns that his brother is kidnapped by Norman.

Jack calls the police. John and Jack are beside themselves with worry until Dylan is found alive in a nearby forest a few days later and taken to the hospital. But he has been traumatized by the ordeal of being left to die in the wilderness and the emotional trauma has rendered him mute.

Three days later, John brings Dylan home. Norman has not been seen for days. John is angry and takes out his frustration on Strick home with a bat. He demands the Stricks tell him Norman’s whereabouts before destroying his beloved T-Bird. This moment shakes John up. So he lets his in-laws take the boys to their home in Los Angeles so he can shape up. But Jack sneaks back home in Oakland and falls asleep watching The Wolf Man. By the time John arrives home, Norman has returned and cuts the power as he sneaks into the house. Stirred awake by the outage, Jack realizes someone has broken in but accidentally knocks John out with a bat. Norman finds Jack and he runs upstairs and out the bathroom window to a branch of a nearby tree. John regains consciousness as Norman chases Jack up the tree. However, Norman loses his grip and falls into the backyard behind the Leary house where he is mauled to death by the neighbor's Doberman Pinschers. Soon after, Norman's parents move away, Dylan returns home, and John gets his job back with his show now airing more comical horror films like Abbott and Costello.

One afternoon, the neighborhood children all appear and ask if John will play one of his monster games with them as usual. After his experiences with Norman, John tells the children he won't play the monster game anymore. When they ask him why, John sees Dexter smoking a cigarette. He realizes he's going down a dark path. John tells the children there are real monsters out there, but he promises to play a better game with them. Later John finds Jack playing his mother's lullaby on the piano while getting Dylan to say the lullaby's title. Jack begins crying and John tries to comfort him. John and Jack get closure and the two embrace Dylan after he says the title of Elizabeth's lullaby: "Jack the Bear". The next day, with their lives slowly returning to normal, John watches his sons playing in the front yard.

== Cast ==
- Danny DeVito as John Leary
- Robert J. Steinmiller Jr. as Jack Leary
- Miko Hughes as Dylan Leary
- Gary Sinise as Norman Strick
- Art LaFleur as Mr. Festinger
- Carl Gabriel Yorke as Gordon Layton
- Stefan Gierasch as Father-in-Law
- Andrea Marcovicci as Elizabeth Leary
- Julia Louis-Dreyfus as Peggy Etinger
- Reese Witherspoon as Karen Morris
- Lee Garlington as Mrs. Festinger
- Christopher Lawford as Vince Buccini
- Justin Mosley Spink as Dexter

== Production ==
CBS Theatrical Films and Jane Fonda's IPC Films had been attempting to adapt the novel Jack the Bear by Dan McCall into a feature film since the late 1970s. The project was considered as a directing vehicle for Fonda's former husband Roger Vadim with a script by Lawrence D. Cohen, until Vadim dropped out and was replaced by Bob Rafelson, with Jack Nicholson attached to star. The film ended up ultimately not happening due to the collapse of CBS Theatrical Films in 1985.

In 1989, it was reported that a new incarnation of the project was in development, with former CBS Theatrical Films hire Ron Yerxa as a co-producer and Steven Zaillian as a screenwriter. Principal photography began in April 1991. The film was initially slated for a Christmas 1991 release date, but due to a need for reshoots involving Danny DeVito's character, filming was not completed until July 1992 as DeVito had scheduling conflicts with his film Hoffa.

== Reception ==
Reviews of the film were mixed to negative. Out of 18 reviews on Rotten Tomatoes, Jack the Bear carries a 28% score with an average rating of 4.7/10. Audiences polled by CinemaScore gave the film an average grade of "B-" on an A+ to F scale.

Critics praised the acting, particularly DeVito's, with The Austin Chronicle's Marjorie Baumgarten writing, "The role of John Leary is a good one for DeVito, a character with many dimensions: bereaved spouse, good-time dad, local TV host of the nightly monster movie show, problem alcoholic." Roger Ebert awarded the film three out of four stars and said "some scenes in the movie are closely observed slices of real life". Critics agreed that the kidnapping plot concerning the sinister neighbor was unnecessary. Baumgarten noted that though the film is told from a child's perspective, "there's a deep brooding and uncertainty at the heart of this bear that's anything but kid stuff".

== Awards and nominations ==
1994 Young Artist Awards

- Won – Best Performance in a Feature Film - Supporting Actress: Reese Witherspoon
- Nominated – Best Performance in a Feature Film - Leading Actor: Robert J. Steinmiller Jr.
- Nominated – Best Performance in a Feature Film - Young Actor 10 or Younger: Miko Hughes
