= The Little Riders =

Book and television film

The Little Riders is a book by Margaretha Shemin, that was made into a television movie in 1996 which aired on the Disney Channel. It tells the story of Joanna Hunter, a young Dutch-American girl who goes to visit her grandparents in the Netherlands, when the Nazis occupy the village. Joanna must protect the statues in the town's clock tower of the freedom fighters who defended the village, when the Nazis threaten to destroy them.

The movie used British and foreign actors. Johanna was played by Noley Thornton. American Luke Edwards also starred. British actors Paul Scofield, Rosemary Harris and Malcolm McDowell were the adult leads. Derek de Lint, Renée Soutendijk, Hidde Maas and Wim Serlie also starred from the Netherlands along with other Brits such as Benedick Blythe, Christopher Villiers and Martin Delaney in smaller roles. Some of the scenes were filmed in the village of De Rijp (the Netherlands) in the summer of 1995.
