= The Stalking of Laurie Show =

- DVD cover with the alternate title of Rivals
- Genre: Crime; Drama
- Written by: Jennifer Salt
- Directed by: Norma Bailey
- Starring: Jennifer Finnigan; Marne Patterson; Mary-Margaret Humes

Production
- Running time: 100 minutes

Original release
- Network: USA Network
- Release: December 22, 2000

The Stalking of Laurie Show (also known by the title Rivals outside of the United States) is a 2000 made-for-TV movie that was directed by Norma Bailey. The movie is based on the true-life murder of Lancaster native Laurie Show.

== Plot ==
Laurie Show was a naive and trusting sixteen year old girl (Jennifer Finnigan), that became entangled in the lives of Michelle Lambert (Marne Patterson) and her boyfriend Lawrence Yunkin. Laurie was initially befriended by Michelle, who later turned on her after Laurie was beaten up and raped by Lawrence. Believing that Laurie was lying about the rape and that she had pursued Lawrence, Michelle began harassing and stalking Laurie, often with the assistance of friends. This harassment culminated in Michelle murdering Laurie in her home with the help of her friend Tabitha Buck. Laurie's mother discovered the body and Michelle, Lawrence, and Tabitha were quickly arrested. Lawrence pleaded guilty and testified against the other two girls in exchange for a reduced sentence, with Michelle and Tabitha receiving life sentences without parole.

== Cast ==
- Mary-Margaret Humes as Hazel Show
- Jennifer Finnigan as Laurie Show
- Marnette Patterson as Michelle Lambert
- Rel Hunt as Butch Yunkin
- Jessica Greco as Samantha Gardner
- Joanne Vannicola as Tabitha Buck
- Richard Fitzpatrick as Uncle Jake
- Sandra Caldwell as Mary Rudolph
- Don Dickinson as Pete Webster
- Polly Shannon as Christine
- Dominic Zamprogna as Andrew
- Karyn Dwyer as Jennifer
- Courtney Hawkrigg as Paula
- Jeff Berg as Danny Gardner

== Reception ==
Critical reception for the film was predominantly negative, with both Variety and People panning the film. The Sun-Sentinel criticized the film as "pointlessly violent" and stated that "[t]he only people who should be more ashamed of it than USA and Raphael -- who obviously won't be -- are those who encourage more such trash by watching".

The Stalking of Laurie Show was also criticized for "[distorting] the truth", with an article in the Lubbock Avalanche-Journal stating that Lambert was not the "90210-style prom queen" nor Show the outcast that they were portrayed as in the film. The reporter went on to argue that the changes to the film, along with the sexual content "designed only to titillate", was largely unnecessary and detracted from the crime itself.
