= It's Spring Training, Charlie Brown =

1992 animated television special

- Genre: Animated television special
- Created by: Charles M. Schulz
- Written by: Charles M. Schulz
- Directed by: Sam Jaimes
- Voices of: Justin Shenkarow; John Christian Graas; Marnette Patterson; Bill Melendez; Gregory Grudt; Travis Boles; Elisabeth Moss; Michael J. Sandler; Noley Thornton; Jessica Nwafor
- Composer: Judy Munsen
- Country of origin: United States

Production
- Executive producer: Lee Mendelson
- Producer: Bill Melendez
- Camera setup: Nick Vasu
- Running time: 23 minutes
- Production companies: Lee Mendelson Film Productions; Bill Melendez Productions

Original release
- Release: January 9, 1996

Related
- Snoopy's Reunion (1991); It's Christmastime Again, Charlie Brown (1992)

It's Spring Training, Charlie Brown is the 35th prime-time animated television special based upon the comic strip Peanuts, by Charles M. Schulz. It was produced in 1992, but unlike previous specials, it was not shown on CBS. It remained unseen until Paramount released it on VHS on January 9, 1996 alongside 1966's Charlie Brown's All-Stars. The special was released by Warner Home Video on the DVD Happiness is ... Peanuts: Go Snoopy Go! on October 9, 2012.

The show's first television airing was on Nickelodeon on February 23, 1998.

== Plot ==
The special follows the spring training of Charlie Brown's baseball team, which is having problems. A child named Leland joins the team. Lucy points out that they are the only team without uniforms, so Charlie Brown and his team train hard for the first game of the season. Thanks to Leland, Charlie Brown's team wins, 27 to 26, therefore getting their uniforms (A recurring plot line is that Leland is so short the other team's pitcher either constantly walks him or beans him in his batting helmet). However, the team loses their next game because Leland has to quit because their new uniforms are too big for him, with Charlie Brown saying at the end, "It's not how you look, it's how you play the game."

== Voices ==
- Justin Shenkarow as Charlie Brown
- John Christian Graas as Linus van Pelt
- Marnette Patterson as Lucy van Pelt
- Gregory Grudt as Leland
- Travis Boles as Schroeder
- Elisabeth Moss as Patty
- Jessica Nwafor as Franklin
- Michael J. Sandler as Boy Player on Opposing Team
- Noley Thornton as Leland’s sister
- Bill Melendez as Snoopy/Woodstock

== Notes ==
- This special never aired during prime time, but was later shown on certain cable TV networks.
- Appearances of Leland and his sister who first appeared in It's an Adventure, Charlie Brown.
- This is the fifth time Charlie Brown's team has won a ball game in animated specials. The other times are A Boy Named Charlie Brown, It's Arbor Day, Charlie Brown, the baseball segment of the "Snoopy's Cat Fight" episode of The Charlie Brown and Snoopy Show (where Charlie Brown is too sick to play and Linus fills in), and the baseball segment in the "You Can't Win, Charlie Brown" episode of Charlie Brown and Snoopy (with Rerun on their team, but they had to forfeit the game because Rerun had gambled that his team would win).
- This is the second time Mr. Hennessy offers Charlie Brown and his team uniforms (the first time being 1966's Charlie Brown's All-Stars), but this time they had to win a game to get the uniforms. Also, Hennessy is briefly seen onscreen, resembling animation producer Bill Melendez.
- This is the last special to not have music written by Vince Guaraldi in it (It's Christmastime Again, Charlie Brown saw the return of Guaraldi's music). It is also the last special to be scored by Judy Munsen.

== Home Media ==
On October 7, 2025, it was re-released on the DVD and Blu-Ray collection Peanuts: 75th Anniversary Ultimate TV Specials Collection along with 39 other Peanuts specials.
