= StarToons =

American animation studio

StarToons International, LLC.
- Industry: Animation
- Founded: 1988; 38 years ago
- Founder: Jon McClenahan
- Defunct: 2001; 25 years ago
- Headquarters: Chicago, Illinois
- Products: TV shows

StarToons International, LLC. was an animation studio located in the Chicago, Illinois area. It was founded by Jon McClenahan, an animator who had previously worked for other studios like Hanna-Barbera. The initial founding of StarToons was in October 1988 and for the most part it provided animation exclusively for Warner Bros. shows, but it also created the character Dudley the Dinosaur for the American Dental Association. Its animators also worked on the 2000 Looney Tunes short Little Go Beep featuring Wile E. Coyote and the Road Runner. StarToons shut down in 2001.

The studio provided animation for the following cartoons:

- Tiny Toon Adventures (1990–1992) - 3 half-hour episodes: Henry Youngman Day, Thirteensomething and It's a Wonderful Tiny Toons Christmas Special.
- Taz-Mania (1991–1992) - The opening and 2 half-hour episodes: Instant Replay/Taz and the Pterodactyl and Hypnotazed/Mum's n' Taz's.
- McGee and Me (1992) - The animated sequences.
- Animaniacs (1993–1998) - 28 segments: Wakko's America, What Are We?, Be Careful What You Eat, Slappy Goes Walnuts, The Big Candy Store, Plane Pals, Meatballs or Consequences, Broadcast Nuisance, Guardin' the Garden, Bumbie's Mom, Wally Llama, Chairman of the Bored, Meet Minerva, And Justice for Slappy, Meet John Brain, Critical Condition, Frontier Slappy, MacBeth, Windsor Hassle, Scare-Happy Slappy, Ragamuffins, Karaoke-Dokie, Testimonials, Dot The Macadamia Nut, Bully for Skippy, Magic Time, The Brain's Apprentice and There's Only One of You. Also, numerous bumpers.
- Secret Adventures (1994) - The animated sequences.
- What a Cartoon! (1995) - 1 short: Drip Dry Drips.
- Histeria! (1998–2000) - 4 half-hour episodes: The Wild West, Around the World In a Daze, Writers of the Purple Prose and Dawn of Time.
