= Bingo (1991 film) =

1991 American family comedy film directed by Matthew Robbins

- Home video release poster
- Directed by: Matthew Robbins
- Written by: Jim Strain
- Produced by: Thomas Baer
- Starring: Cindy Williams; David Rasche; Robert J. Steinmiller Jr.
- Cinematography: John McPherson
- Edited by: Maryann Brandon
- Music by: Richard Gibbs
- Production companies: Tri-Star Pictures; Thomas Baer Productions
- Distributed by: Tri-Star Pictures
- Release date: August 9, 1991
- Running time: 89 minutes
- Country: United States
- Language: English
- Budget: $10 million
- Box office: $8.6 million

Bingo is a 1991 American family comedy film directed by Matthew Robbins from a script by Jim Strain. The film follows Bingo, a clever runaway circus dog who goes on a cross-country search to find Chuckie (Robert J. Steinmiller Jr.), a boy he befriended. Along the way, Bingo gets into various adventures with colorful characters. Bingo was portrayed by Lace, a female border collie adopted from a shelter. Principal photography began on September 12, 1990.

The film was released to theaters on August 9, 1991 by Tri-Star Pictures. It was a box office disappointment and received mostly negative reviews. The film is intended as a parody of boy-and-his-dog films and has elements of absurdist humor and dark comedy.

== Plot ==
On the outskirts of Denver, Colorado, Bingo the Border Collie performs routine chores for a circus. When one of the star poodles injures its foot, Bingo is asked to stand in for that night’s performance. However, Bingo’s fear of fire leads him to chicken out of jumping through a hoop of fire. Bingo’s fear stems from having lost his mother to a fire as a puppy. Bingo, berated by the circus master for his failure, leaves in search of a better life.

12-year-old Chuckie Devlin is attempting to show off his bike skills to friends by jumping it across a river. Instead, he falls into the river and wrecks his bike. Bingo sees the unconscious boy and rescues him. The dog and the boy quickly bond, and Chuckie takes him home where he lives with his 14-year-old older brother Chickie, mother Natalie, and father Hal, a placekicker for the Denver Broncos. Chuckie hides Bingo away in a cabinet as his family does not want a pet.

Bingo is eventually found out when Chuckie goes to school and the family finds evidence of the dog’s mischief, including getting into Natalie's cold cream, chewing up Chickie's one award, and defecating on the front driveway, which Hal stepped in. They angrily confront the boy when he comes home, but this becomes forgotten when Hal suddenly learns he has been traded to the Green Bay Packers. The next day, the family departs for Wisconsin, leaving Bingo behind. However, Chuckie comes up with a plan to be reunited with Bingo: leaving a scent trail for Bingo to follow by urinating at road stops.

Bingo follows along the "trail" and gets roped into multiple misadventures—including banding together with other dogs to destroy a hot dog stand that uses the meat of impounded mutts, and helping to catch Lennie and Eli, two criminals who have hijacked a camper and taken a family as hostages. When he is falsely accused of a crime he did not commit, Bingo is sent to jail, but later escapes.

Bingo finally makes it to Green Bay, but sees Chuckie walking another dog. Bingo, not realizing that it is a neighbor’s dog, wanders off, dejected at having been replaced. He eventually gets a job licking the plates clean at a nearby diner. Lennie and Eli escape prison and track down the dog to Green Bay. They post reward flyers for Bingo, and one of the diner employees responds, alerting them to the dog's whereabouts. Chuckie happens to see a flyer too, and the boy, the dog, and the two criminals converge in an alley behind the diner. When Lennie and Eli discover Chuckie is the son of a professional football player, they hold the boy captive in a warehouse. Knowing they can successfully gamble on a rigged outcome, they call Chuckie’s mother and say they will only give up the boy if Hal misses all his field goals during the day’s game.

Bingo is able to get away and warn Natalie and Chickie, before returning to rescue Chuckie. The dog is overpowered by Lennie and Eli, who tie him up next to Chuckie and reveal a bomb with which they intend to destroy the warehouse. As the goons leave, they toss a cigar, leading to the warehouse catching fire. Bingo breaks free of his restraints, but his fear prevents him from leaping through to get to the fire alarm. When Chuckie begins to collapse from heat and smoke inhalation, Bingo overcomes his fear and triggers the alarm. Firemen arrive and rescue Chuckie while police surround Lennie and Eli’s car. The criminals threaten to trigger the bomb unless Hal misses the game-deciding field goal, but the police call the criminals’ bluff.

Back at the warehouse, Bingo carries the bomb away from the site. Hal makes the field goal, and Chuckie watches, horrified, as the bomb explodes in the distance. Later, the boy awakens in a hospital, and his family takes him to a room down the hall where Bingo is recuperating. The room is filled with all the people and dogs that Bingo has encountered along his journey. Chuckie and Bingo celebrate their reunion, and the former asks his dad if he can keep the dog. After some encouragement, Hal gives in and says, "Sure, son. Just as soon as we have him neutered", prompting a nervous look from Bingo.

== Cast ==
- Cindy Williams as Natalie Devlin
- David Rasche as Hal Devlin
- Robert J. Steinmiller Jr. as Chuckie Devlin
- David French as Chickie Devlin
- Kurt Fuller as Lennie
- Joe Guzaldo as Eli
- Robert Thurston as Mr. Thompson
- Sheelah Megill as Mrs. Thompson
- Chelan Simmons as Cindy Thompson
- Kimberley Warnat as Sandy Thompson
- Glenn Shadix as Duke
- Janet Wright as Emma Lois
- Wayne Robson as Four-Eyes
- Suzie Plakson as Ginger
- Simon Webb as Steve
- Tamsin Kelsey as Bunny
- Betty Linde as Mrs. Wallaby
- James Kidnie as Defense Attorney
- Norman Browning as Prosecutor
- Blu Mankuma as Motorcycle Cop
- Jackson Davies as Vet
- Antony Holland as Circus vet
- Bill Meilen as Vic
- Stephen E. Miller as Sheriff Clay
- Drum Garrett as Dishwasher
- Howard Storey as Coach
- Denalda Williams as Doctor's assistant
- Gloria Macarenko as Reporter
- Sylvia Mitchell as Court reporter
- Frank Welker as Special vocal effects

== Merchandise ==
Merchandise from TriStar included trading cards, a stuffed animal, and a tie-in novelization by B.B. Hiller from Scholastic Paperbacks.

== Reception ==
=== Box office ===
Bingo was released on August 9, 1991, opening in 10th place with a gross of $2,141,360. Its total box office take was $8,667,684 from a budget of $10 million, making the film a box office bomb.

=== Critical response ===
The film received largely negative reviews. Michael Wilmington of Los Angeles Times said "Bingo is "a movie that shouldn't happen to a dog--or an audience, either. It's one more example of how witlessly even the most charming movie cliches can get deformed: a '90s-style Lassie Come Home, transplanted to the era of The Simpsons, The Texas Chainsaw Massacre and The NFL Today." The Washington Times gave Bingo a half-star out of four, and deemed it "The Problem Child of pet pooch movies."

Clifford Terry of the Chicago Tribune wrote:

Based on the children's song (which is sung interminably) and billed as an 'over-the-edge comedy,' Bingo tries to send up the boy-and-his-wonder-dog saga, with such bits as bickering parents...discussions about body odor and houses that are crammed full of NFL trappings, from Bronco lamps to Packer wallpaper. But director Matthew Robbins (Batteries Not Included) frequently resorts to mere absurdity. A particularly heavy bit of overreach occurs in the scene where Bingo testifies in court against the robbers, and then is pawprinted and railroaded to the slammer himself. The result is that, despite the star quality of Bingo the dog (the camera, as they say, loves him), Bingo the movie succeeds neither as a snappy spoof nor as a canine caper.

Vincent Canby of The New York Times wrote, "Bingo is a live-action film that has the manner of a cartoon. That it's never as funny as it should be isn't the fault of the human cast. Robert J. Steinmiller Jr., who plays Chuckie, and David Rasche and Cindy Williams, who play Chuckie's sometimes lunatic parents, are good farceurs." He criticized the dog's performance as the sort "that indicates he has been trained within an inch of his life", and added that the film's comedy "comes through mostly in scenes that have nothing to do with Bingo, as when Kurt Fuller and Joe Guzaldo, as the dognappers, argue about the civil rights and responsibilities of felons".

Hal Hinson of The Washington Post, one of few critics to give a positive review, called the film "a flat-out hoot". He praised the script for "breaking off in weird directions" and said "Robbins directs the film with a straight-faced style -- call it the Green Acres touch -- as if there were nothing at all unusual about a dog who dials 911 and barks out his message in Morse code". Hinson concluded Robbins "holds true to [Bingo's] spirit of absurdist irreverence" and "gives us...something that can only be described as canine surrealism".

The Hartford Courant wrote, "Part Lassie Come Home, part Benji, part Baxter, this dog-road saga comes up with a few waggish twists, as it relentlessly parodies somewhat similar human quest movies. Mostly, though, this is a shaggy-dog misadventure, too dumb and cute for grown-ups, too tasteless and pseudo-sophisticated for family audiences". Chris Hicks of the Deseret News said, "Bingo is somewhat inventive, but isn't written well enough to follow through on its ideas. And while rolling through a series of movie cliches, spoofing prison films, courtroom dramas, circus pictures, etc., there is a lethargy that wears down the audience."

In 2017, Consequence ranked Bingo at number 29 in its list of the 100 Greatest Dogs in Film History.

== See also ==
- List of American films of 1991
