= The Giant of Thunder Mountain =

1991 film

- Directed by: James W. Roberson
- Screenplay by: Richard Kiel; Chrystle Fiedler; Tony Lozito
- Starring: Richard Kiel; Noley Thornton
- Release date: 1991

The Giant of Thunder Mountain is a 1991 drama film starring Richard Kiel (The Spy Who Loved Me) and Noley Thornton (Beverley Hills, 90210). Bart the Bear also appeared in the movie. The screenplay was jointly written by Richard Kiel, Chrystle Fiedler, and Tony Lozito. It was directed by James W. Roberson.

== Plot summary ==
In the town of Weaverton, signs of a circus are being posted. In Zeke MacGruder's barn, a group of boys are holding a meeting. Two brothers, Tommy (Chance Michael Corbitt) and Ben (Ryan Todd) are daring to climb Thunder Mountain, where it is said a giant lives. The boys take the dare and set out up the mountain. They get caught in a thunderstorm and barely escape getting hit by lightning (this is what gives Thunder Mountain its name). They take refuge inside a strange oversized log cabin. Whilst there, they find mysterious carved wooden figures. Suddenly, the giant returns and finds the boys hiding under a table, but they escape with one of the wooden figures and go back to town. When they reach home, they tell their family their amazing story, but no one believes them. The next morning, they set out with another boy, Zeke MacGruder (Daniel Pipoly) who doubts Tommy and Ben have seen the giant. Tommy and Ben's younger sister, Amy (Noley Thornton) follows them, but almost gets caught in a bear trap. The boys tell her to leave but she persists and continues following them.

The three boys watch the giant from the woods. Zeke excuses himself and runs away, but Amy steps out from the woods and introduces herself and her brothers to the giant, Eli Weaver (Richard Kiel). They help him with his chores including helping him plant young fir trees. The boys volunteer to get water for the trees and go in the cabin to fetch a bucket. When they do so they discover some of Eli's gold nuggets. Tommy puts a few in his pocket, and they go outside and fill the bucket with water. Eli's pet wolf shows up to check out the children and after this the children return to town. Amy discovers Tommy and Ben looking at the gold nuggets and they allow her to have one of them with the promise she won't tell their mother. Amy goes to the general store to buy candy, and offers to pay for the candy with the gold. Hezekiah Crow (Jack Elam) overhears Amy and says he is an expert in gauging whether a nugget is gold or not, and proclaims the nugget as being 'Fool's Gold.' But in trade he offers her tickets to his carnival, and she bargains for extra tickets. She goes to see Eli and invites him to dinner and gives him one of the carnival tickets.

Eli comes to Wilson's house for dinner, and after dinner he repairs their cuckoo clock. Hezekiah Crow's circus parades through Weaverton, hosted by Zeke's father, Mr. MacGruder (Ed Williams). The circus's many performers include a juggling act, a trained Asian elephant, a trained lion, a boa constrictor, a long-legged clown act, a camel, a high-jumping acrobat, and two white horses.

The final act arrives, a trained black bear act. This reminds Eli of the day that a giant grizzly bear (Bart the Bear) killed his parents. Amy admires a beautiful doll at a circus booth, and Eli throws balls to knock down pins. The booth is run by one of Hezekiah's sons (William Sanderson), who puts a rod through the pins so they can't be knocked over. But Eli's throw breaks the pins and he expects the carnival man to give Amy the doll, but instead he gives her an inferior doll. Amy is disappointed, and Eli grabs hold of the carnival man and lifts him in the air and then drops him on the ground. Eli hands the beautiful ceramic doll to Amy. A crowd has gathered around Eli and Amy's mother appears and scolds Amy for causing trouble. The crowd shout insults at Eli and Eli crushes the doll's head with one squeeze and warns the town to stay off Thunder Mountain. Amy tries to tell him to stay, but he says that he will not visit a town that's disrespectful to him and storms off. The next scene is at a bar, where several men (including old man Doc) are playing poker. Hezekiah and his two sons plot to go to Eli's cabin to obtain Eli's gold. Meanwhile, at his cabin, Eli burns the wooden statuette he carved of Amy.

Amy goes to see Eli and says she is sorry for what happened in town, and the two are friends again. Eli and Amy go for a walk in the woods and he shows her the biggest tree in the forest 'The General.' Tommy and Ben go to find Amy and at the cabin are accosted by Hezekiah Crow and his two sons. They kidnap Ben, knock out Tommy, and take Eli's gold. Hearing the approach of a posse, they escape out a window in the back of the cabin, leaving Tommy lying unconscious on the floor.

Meanwhile, in the woods, the grizzly approaches and Eli fights it and knocks it out with a tree branch. Amy runs for the cabin and Eli limps along after her. Amy arrives at the cabin and runs to her mother. The posse do not ascertain what is going on and assume Eli has taken Amy's brothers and set out to catch him. While being stalked, Eli is wounded in the leg and has to hide. He hides under a pile of leaves and surprises one of the men of the posse who has caught his leg in his own bear trap. He takes the man's gun and takes the trap off the man's leg. The posse burns Eli's cabin as revenge for their mistaken belief he kidnapped the children.

Amy and her mom return to town with Tommy. The kidnappers go to the MacGruder's house to steal their belongings and Eli tracks them down and frees the MacGruder's and Ben. Hezekiah Crow tries to trick Eli and escapes out a window. Eli follows him and Hezekiah comes face to face in the dark with the true Giant of Thunder Mountain - the grizzly. Caught between Eli and the bear he surrenders to Eli and the posse.

The movie concludes with the town asking Eli if he would become their sheriff, and promise to rebuild his cabin. Eli says he must return to the mountain, but leaves as their friend.

== Cast ==
- Cloris Leachman as The Narrator / The Elder Amy
- Richard Kiel as Eli Weaver
- Lynne Seus as Ma Weaver
- Doug Seus as Pa Weaver
- Marianne Gordon as Alicia Wilson (credited as Marianne Rogers)
- Noley Thornton as Amy Wilson
- Chance Michael Corbitt as Tommy Wilson
- Ryan Todd as Ben Wilson
- Jack Elam as Hezekiah Crow
- William Sanderson as Percey Crow
- George 'Buck' Flower as Oliver Crow
- Ellen Crawford as Agnes Macgruder
- Danuel Pipoly as Zeke Macgruder
- Ed Williams as Mr. Macgruder
- Foster Brooks as Doc (Townsman)
- John Quade as Carl, Townsman
- James Hampton as Jesse
- Dennis Fimple as Henderson, Townsman
- Burt Marshall as Mobbs, Townsman
- Myra Chason as Customer, Townsman

=== The Townsmen ===
- Warren Sweeney
- Robert Foster
- Jeff Till
- Ron Hardee
- George Davis as George, The Poker Player Saloon Patron
- Charles P. Bernuth as Poker Player #1
- John Herklotz as Poker Player #2
- Beverly Stern as Blonde Floozy

The Boys Club

- Joshua Mitchell
- John Thornton
- Bennett Kiel
- Brad McPeters as Posse Man #1
- John Cunningham as Posse Man #2 / Vigilante

=== The Vigilantes ===
- Paul Johnson
- Bart Brown
- Kim Wood
- Bob Nelson
- Kenny Linder
- Ron Forbes
- Paul Fairbanks
- Cleo Blackburn
- Townser Leonar
- Gary Preston
- Dustin Fischer
- Wayne White
- Robert Seastron
- Jerry Westfall
- Ray Preston

=== Animals ===
- Bart the Bear as The Bear
- Tai (elephant) as Circus Elephant (uncredited)
- Josef the Lion as Circus Lion (uncredited)

== Production notes ==
The film was shot in Yosemite National Park and North Fork, California. It was released in the U.S. in March 1991, and at the Cannes Film Market in France, in May 1991. The films production company was American Happenings and Herklotz Enterprises. The distributors were Castle Hill Productions and Plaza Entertainment, with special effects by FX West.

The real-life owners and trainers of Bart the Bear (who played the bear), Doug and Lynne Seus, have cameos in the film as Eli's father and mother in a flashback.

== Reception ==
Due to appreciative coverage by the Film Advisory Board and religious publications that noted the film's Christian themes, the marketing attempted to push the notion that it was "critically acclaimed." However, the film's limited release was largely unnoticed, and there was no instance of acclaim by a major critic or publication. Some retrospective reviews have noted the film's reliance on contrivance and "stock" filmmaking approaches. It grossed only $126,911 at the U.S. box office.
