= Fine Things (film) =

- DVD cover
- Genre: Drama; Romance
- Based on: Fine Things by Danielle Steel
- Written by: Peter Lefcourt
- Directed by: Tom Moore
- Starring: D.W. Moffett; Tracy Pollan; Cloris Leachman; Noley Thornton; Judith Hoag; Darrell Larson
- Music by: Lee Holdridge
- Country of origin: United States
- Original language: English

Production
- Executive producer: Douglas S. Cramer
- Producers: Hugh Benson; Tim King
- Cinematography: Lloyd Ahern II
- Editors: Wayne Wahrman; Michael S. McLean
- Running time: 145 minutes
- Production companies: The Cramer Company; NBC Productions

Original release
- Network: NBC
- Release: October 16, 1990

Fine Things, also known as Danielle Steel's Fine Things, is a 1990 romantic drama television film directed by Tom Moore. The film is based upon the 1987 novel of the same name written by Danielle Steel.

== Plot ==
Bernard "Bernie" Fine is a highly successful businessman who moves from New York City to San Francisco for his work at the west coast Wolff's department store. One day, he meets Jane, a little girl who is lost while shopping at the store. Bernie approaches her, and helps her by paging her mother. They enjoy an ice cream sundae in his office while waiting for her mother, Liz O'Reilly, a single mother. Jane and her mom reunite shortly after, and she invites Bernie to join the two of them for lunch at their friend's beachhouse at Stinson. After a lengthy time of dating, Bernie and Liz decide to marry. Although his mother Ruth, a proud Jew, is not enthusiastic about Liz's religious background, she eventually comes to accept Liz as her new daughter-in-law. Soon, Liz becomes pregnant and gives birth to a son, Alexander. Life is looking great for the couple.

Everything changes when Chandler Scott comes back into their lives. Liz, fearing he will demand to be a part of Jane's life, offers him $25,000 to leave without ever returning. This is despite their lawyer's strong advice not to offer him money, explaining it is illegal. Meanwhile, after Alexander is born, Liz is diagnosed with bone cancer. She refuses chemotherapy until Bernie encourages her it's the right thing to do, although Liz tells Bernie she will continue her job teaching at elementary school and finish out the school year. As Liz begins to lose her hair, Ruth buys a wig for her, and apologizes to Liz for not giving her a chance. As her health continues to deteriorate, Liz decides to give up on chemotherapy, explaining she does not want to spend her final days on medicine. Finally after an emotional farewell, she dies in bed.

Soon after, Bernie buys a vacation cottage in Napa Valley, and hopes to start a new life with Jane and Alexander. Tragedy strikes again when Jane is kidnapped by Chandler. Bernie is furious and desperate to save her. Frustrated by the police's incapability to search for her, he uses the help of private detectives to locate her himself and secretly brings her back home.

While Bernie is handling all his current problems, he falls in love with a single doctor, Molly, who lives in Napa. As they become closer, Jane fears she may lose Bernie's love, until Ruth talks with her about how Bernie will never lose love for her, even if he marries somebody new. After Bernie and Molly have been going out for some time, Bernie ultimately decides on staying and starting a new life in Napa, including opening a new store in an old schoolhouse, which he later names "Fine Things," after all the fine things that have come into Bernie's life.

After a long time of no communication, Chandler sets a trial date to demand full custody of Jane. Chandler is about to win the case, until evidence is leaked that Chandler was involved with a cocaine smuggle. Bernie wins official custody of Jane and they live happily ever after with Molly, Bernie's new girlfriend. Jane initially disapproves, but learns to like her. The movie closes with Bernie and Molly taking Jane and Alexander to see his new store, and he surprises Jane with a new dog. Knowing how much she means to Bernie, Jane feels she can finally accept a new life, and chooses to call Bernie daddy.

== Cast ==
- D.W. Moffett as Bernard Stephen 'Bernie' Fine
- Tracy Pollan as Elizabeth Kathleen 'Liz' O'Reilly
- Noley Thornton as Jane O'Reilly
- Cloris Leachman as Ruth Fine
- Judith Hoag as Molly
- Darrell Larson as Chandler Scott
- G. W. Bailey as Grossman
- George Coe as Paul Berman
- Duncan Ballard & Emily Ballard as Alexander
- Scott Jaeck as Doctor Finn (oncologist)
