= Noley Thornton =

American actress

- Occupation: Actress

Noley Thornton is an American former television and film actress who was active in U.S. media from 1990 through 1998.

In the early 1990s, Thornton was nominated for a Young Artist Award twice. Once in the category of "Best Youth Actress in a TV Miniseries, Movie-of-the-Week, or TV Movie” for her lead role as the title character of the Disney Channel mini-series Heidi (1993) and the following year in the category “Best Performance: Young Actress in a TV Comedy Series" at the 16th Youth in Film Awards for her starring role in The Martin Short Show.

== Filmography ==
Film and television
| Year | Title | Role | Notes | Reference(s) |
|---|---|---|---|---|
| 1990 | Fine Things | Jane O'Reilly | Television film based on the novel of the same name | |
| 1991 | The Giant of Thunder Mountain | Amy Wilson | Film | |
| 1991 | Defending Your Life | Victorian Girl | Film | |
| 1991 | Quantum Leap | Lea | Episode: "Dreams" | |
| 1992 | It's Spring Training, Charlie Brown | Leland’s sister (voice) | Voice role; television film | |
| 1992 | Star Trek: The Next Generation | Clara Sutter | Episode: "Imaginary Friend" | |
| 1992 | A Private Matter | Carol Callaghan | Television film | |
| 1993 | Heidi | Heidi | Television adaptation (Disney Channel) | |
| 1993 | L.A. Law | Emily Gelleher | Episode: "The Green, Green Grass of Home" | |
| 1994 | Star Trek: Deep Space Nine | Taya | Episode: "Shadowplay" | |
| 1994 | The Martin Short Show | Caroline Short | Television series | |
| 1994-1995 | Beverly Hills, 90210 | Erica | Recurring role | |
| 1996 | The Little Riders | Joanne Hunter | Television film | |
