= It's Christmastime Again, Charlie Brown =

1992 animated Christmas television special

- Genre: Christmas; Comedy
- Based on: Peanuts by Charles M. Schulz
- Written by: Charles M. Schulz
- Directed by: Bill Melendez
- Voices of: Jamie E. Smith; Mindy Ann Martin; John Christian Graas; Marnette Patterson; Phillip Lucier; Lindsay Benesh; Sean Mendelson; Deanna Tello; Matthew Slowik; Brittany M. Thornton; Bill Melendez
- Music by: Vince Guaraldi
- Opening theme: "Linus and Lucy"
- Ending theme: "Linus and Lucy"
- Country of origin: United States
- Original language: English

Production
- Executive producer: Lee Mendelson
- Producer: Bill Melendez
- Editors: Chuck McCann; Warren Taylor
- Running time: 23 minutes
- Production companies: Lee Mendelson Film Productions; Bill Melendez Productions

Original release
- Network: CBS
- Release: November 27, 1992

Related
- It's Spring Training, Charlie Brown (1992); You're in the Super Bowl, Charlie Brown (1994)

It's Christmastime Again, Charlie Brown is the 36th prime-time animated television special based on the comic strip Peanuts by Charles M. Schulz. It originally aired on CBS on November 27, 1992.

The program is composed of various storylines from the comic strip. It was the first Christmas-themed Peanuts special since the inaugural A Charlie Brown Christmas in 1965, though an episode of The Charlie Brown and Snoopy Show featured a new Christmas vignette in 1985.

The animation for the special was done by Wang Film Productions in Taiwan, making it the second Peanuts special after Snoopy's Reunion to be animated by an overseas studio rather than Bill Melendez Productions, who served as animation revisionists.

This was the final new Peanuts animated special to air on CBS. The network cancelled all future animated specials, although they still aired in re-runs until 2000.

== Plot ==
It's Christmastime Again, Charlie Brown is composed of several Christmas-themed storylines, all taken directly from the Peanuts comic strip:

- Linus van Pelt tries unsuccessfully to use a cardboard box as a sled.
- Charlie Brown unsuccessfully tries to sell wreaths door-to-door before Thanksgiving. Franklin points out that Charlie Brown is adding to the commercialism of Christmas, but Charlie Brown disagrees "until I sell one." (Violet and the original Patty make cameos in this sketch, a rare 1990s appearance for the two.)
- Peppermint Patty worries about her Christmas book report.
- Peppermint Patty and Marcie attend a performance of Handel's Messiah. The following day at school, Peppermint Patty writes about the performance. Neither she nor Marcie know Handel's first name, so Peppermint Patty credits the piece to "Joe Handel."
- Snoopy becomes a Santa on the street, Lucy and Sally beg to differ.
- Woodstock and his bird friends play chamber music inside a snowman's hat.
- Charlie Brown tries to explain the true meaning of Christmas to his sister Sally, who is convinced that the true meaning of Christmas is "getting all you can get while the getting is good" when she is writing a letter to Santa, but she tunes him out. She also writes to Mrs. Claus, who she calls Mary Christmas.
- Snoopy, Woodstock and his friends dance with the candy canes that were on Charlie Brown's tree.
- Sally goes to Linus' house for the meaning of Christmas and complains to Linus about calling birds in "The Twelve Days of Christmas". Linus tells Sally about Albert Schweitzer and how he does not like Christmas presents because he hated to write thank-you notes. Sally asks who Albert Schweitzer was.
- Charlie Brown sells his entire comic book collection in order to buy Peggy Jean a nice pair of gloves, only to find that she has already bought a pair.
- The kids participate in a Christmas play, where Marcie plays The Virgin Mary, Franklin gets the role of Gabriel. Peppermint Patty gets the role of a sheep, to her dismay. Sally is given the role of an angel, who has to say the line "Hark!" in the same play to summon a herald angel (though she tells Charlie Brown that this will be somebody named 'Harold Angel). However, she inadvertently yells "Hockey stick!", and then mopes about it at home. Later, a boy named Harold Angel drops by to visit Charlie Brown, looking for Sally.

== Cast ==
- Jamie E. Smith as Charlie Brown
- John Christian Graas as Linus van Pelt
- Marnette Patterson as Lucy van Pelt
- Mindy Ann Martin as Sally Brown
- Matthew Slowik as Harold Angel
- Phillip Lucier as Peppermint Patty
- Lindsay Benesh as Marcie
- Sean Mendelson as Franklin
- Deanna Tello as Peggy Jean, Violet and Patty
- Brittany M. Thornton as Frieda
- Bill Melendez as Snoopy and Woodstock

== Music score ==
Rather than having a new musical score composed for It's Christmastime Again, Charlie Brown, jazz composer Vince Guaraldi's musical scores were reused and performed by jazz pianist David Benoit. It was the first time Guaraldi's music had been used in a Peanuts special since It's Arbor Day, Charlie Brown (1976). Guaraldi composed music scores for the first 16 Peanuts television specials and one feature film (A Boy Named Charlie Brown) before his death in February 1976.

Benoit previously had scored an episode of This Is America, Charlie Brown and released several Peanuts compositions on his albums.

All songs written by Vince Guaraldi, except where noted.

1. "Linus and Lucy"
2. "Charlie Brown Theme" (Vince Guaraldi, Lee Mendelson)
3. "Classical Horns"
4. "Christmas Is Coming" (opening credits)
5. "Blue Charlie Brown"
6. "Hallelujah" (George Frideric Handel)
7. "Blue Charlie Brown"
8. "Classical Violins"
9. "Charlie Brown Theme"
10. "O Tannenbaum" (Ernst Anschütz)
11. "Christmas Time Is Here (instrumental)
12. "Blue Charlie Brown"
13. "Skating"
14. "Hark, the Herald Angels Sing" (Charles Wesley)
15. "Blue Charlie Brown"
16. "O Tannenbaum" (Ernst Anschütz)
17. "Hark, the Herald Angels Sing" (Charles Wesley)
18. "Linus and Lucy"
19. "Linus and Lucy" (end credits)

== Release ==
=== Broadcast history ===
It's Christmastime Again, Charlie Brown was first shown on CBS on Friday, November 27, 1992, and was the last Peanuts special to have its television premiere on that network. The show received a 10.0 rating and was watched by approximately 9.3 million households.

The special no longer airs on American television as both CBS and its successor Peanuts broadcaster, ABC, abandoned it in favor of the similarly formatted Charlie Brown's Christmas Tales. In Canada, YTV still airs it as a standalone special as of 2012.

=== Home media ===
A VHS release was made available at Shell gas stations a few months prior to the TV airing, which would make this the first Peanuts special released directly to video.

Paramount gave it another video release in 1996, and it was later included as a bonus special on the DVD and Blu-ray of A Charlie Brown Christmas by Warner Home Video, who most recently owned the physical home media rights to both specials.

On October 7, 2025, it was re-released on the DVD and Blu-Ray collection Peanuts: 75th Anniversary Ultimate TV Specials Collection along with 39 other Peanuts specials.
