= David Healy =

David Healy may refer to:

- David Healy (actor) (1929–1995), American-born, also appeared in many British films and TV shows
- David Healy (astronomer) (1936–2011), American astrophotographer and asteroid discoverer
- David Healy (footballer) (born 1979), Northern Irish footballer
- David Healy (psychiatrist) (born 1954), Irish psychiatrist
- David Healy, a fictional character in the TV series Roseanne
