= They (1993 film) =

- Based on: short story by Rudyard Kipling
- Teleplay by: Edithe Swensen
- Directed by: John Korty
- Starring: Patrick Bergin; Vanessa Redgrave; Valerie Mahaffey; Rutanya Alda
- Theme music composer: Gerald Gouriet
- Countries of origin: United States; France
- Original language: English

Production
- Producers: Art Seidel; Bridget Terry
- Cinematography: Hiro Narita
- Editor: Jim Oliver
- Running time: 100 minutes
- Production companies: France 2 France 3

Original release
- Release: November 14, 1993

They (also known as They Watch or Children of the Mist) is a 1993 television film about the supernatural. A father loses his daughter in a car accident after missing her ballet recital. However, with the help of a mysterious old lady he is able to communicate with her spirit. It is based on an early-1900s (decade) short story by Rudyard Kipling.

== Cast ==
- Patrick Bergin as Mark Samuels
- Vanessa Redgrave as Florence Latima
- Valerie Mahaffey as Chris Samuels
- Nancy Moore Atchison as Nikki Samuels
- Rutanya Alda as Sue Madehurst
- Brandlyn Whitaker as Kaitlin Samuels
- Ken Strong as Len Ott

== Nominations ==
Young Artist Awards

- Best Youth Actress in a TV Mini-Series, M.O.W. or Special - Nancy Moore Atchinson
- Outstanding Family TV Special, M.O.W. or Mini-Series
