= Heidi (miniseries) =

- Home video cover
- Based on: Heidi by Johanna Spyri
- Written by: Jeanne Rosenberg
- Directed by: Michael Rhodes
- Starring: Noley Thornton; Jason Robards; Jane Seymour; Jane Hazlegrove; Ben Brazier; Lexi Randall
- Music by: Lee Holdridge
- Country of origin: United States
- Original language: English
- No. of episodes: 2

Production
- Executive producer: Bill McCutchen
- Producers: Frank Agrama; Daniele Lorenzano
- Cinematography: Denis C. Lewiston
- Editor: Randy Jon Morgan
- Running time: 193 minutes
- Production companies: Harmony Gold; Bill McCutchen Productions; Silvio Berlusconi Communications

Original release
- Network: Disney Channel
- Release: July 18 – July 19, 1993

Heidi is a 1993 American two-part, three-hour television miniseries based on the classic Swiss 1881 novel of the same name by Johanna Spyri. Heidi originally aired on the Disney Channel on July 18 and 19, 1993, and starred Noley Thornton in the title role.

== Plot ==
At the beginning of part one of the miniseries, John and Adelheid are killed in a tree accident following an argument with John's father, Tobias. Their infant daughter, Heidi, survives the accident. Eight years later, Heidi is being raised by her cousin Dete in Switzerland. Dete soon becomes selfish and unwilling to incur the costs of raising Heidi. Dete decides to take Heidi to live in the Alps with her grandfather. Still distraught over the death of his son, he initially resents Heidi's presence, but as the story progresses, Heidi's innocence and charm break through her grandfather's tough exterior, and she also makes friends with a young goatherd named Peter. Later, Heidi's charmed life falls apart. Dete comes to take her away from her grandfather, placing her with a wealthy family in Frankfurt. She is enlisted as a companion for Klara, a wheelchair-using girl who is considered an invalid by her family. Heidi manages to spread her joyous disposition in this environment as well.

In part two, three months have passed and Heidi still lives in Frankfurt, but she becomes very homesick. After finding Heidi sleepwalking one night, the Doctor tells Herr Sesemann that Heidi needs to be sent back to the Alps, otherwise, she will become much worse. Reluctant for her friend to leave and become lonely again, Klara agrees to let Heidi return to the Alps, in return for that Heidi promises to come back to Frankfurt after a month once she feels better. Heidi returns to the Alps and regains her energy back. During her return, she sends a letter to Klara with two requests: to come to the mountains and visit her, as well as for the doctor to check on Grandmother. Honouring her requests, Klara sends the doctor to check up on Grandmother, but due to her age, the doctor is unable to care for her. Before dying, Grandmother asks to Heidi to promise to remember her and to look inside of herself. Later, Klara comes to visit Heidi while Peter gives both girls the cold shoulder and pushes Klara's wheelchair which causes it to break. While visiting the Lady of the Mountain, Heidi tries to convince Klara that they should both live their own lives after remembering Grandmother's final words to her and that they will always be friends. Klara becomes upset, calls Heidi a liar and confesses that she hates her. Walking away, Heidi nearly falls off a cliff, but is rescued by Peter and Klara. Returning, Klara takes Heidi's words to heart and finds the strength to walk again. The children then part ways. Heidi convinces Peter to go to school and continues her life with her grandfather, telling him she loves him and she is finally home.

== Cast ==
- Noley Thornton as Heidi
- Jason Robards as Grandfather Tobias
- Jane Seymour as Fraulein Rottenmeier
- Siân Phillips as Frau Sesemann
- Andrew Bicknell as Herr Herbert Sesemann
- Lexi Randall as Klara
- Edward Highmore as Herr Kandidat
- Basil Hoskins as Sebastian
- Michael Simkins as Dr. Friedrich
- Jane Hazlegrove as Cousin Dete
- Benjamin Brazier as Peter
- Patricia Neal as Grandmother
- Catherine Punch as Tinette
- Daniel Flynn as John
- Annemarie Bubke as Adelheid
- John Quentin as Pastor

== Production ==
The series was shot in both Salzburg and Tirol in Austria. The Church is the St. Nikolauskirche, Bichl, Matrei, Osttirol.

== Release ==
Heidi aired on the Disney Channel in two parts on July 18 and 19, 1993.

== Reception ==
Reviews of the series were generally positive, with praise for the performance of Noley Thornton as Heidi. A review in the Chicago Tribune described Thornton's work as an "outstanding performance as the girl who has the innate ability to change people's lives". Gary Marsh, vice president of original programming for the Disney Channel, said that Thornton did not play as happy, carefree Heidi as in other adaptations, but rather as an orphan who is in a desperate search for a home.

Lee Winfrey of The Philadelphia Inquirer lauded the miniseries for its lavish production when compared to previous adaptations, calling it "elaborate" and "elegant".

=== Accolades ===
Heidi was nominated for best miniseries or TV film in the 51st Golden Globes.
