= Fine Things =

1987 novel by Danielle Steel

- First edition
- Author: Danielle Steel
- Language: English
- Genre: Romance novel
- Publisher: Delacorte Press
- Publication date: February 1, 1987
- Publication place: United States
- Media type: Print (Hardback & Paperback)
- Pages: 432 pp
- ISBN: 0-440-20056-3
- OCLC: 17609637

Fine Things is a romance novel by American Danielle Steel. The book was published on February 1, 1987, by Dell Publications. A film adaptation was released in 1990. It is Steel's 21st novel.

== Plot summary ==
The plot follows Bernard Fine, a fictional character in his 30s who has recently been promoted to senior vice-president of Wolff's Department Store in his home town of New York City. Although enjoying his life, Bernie is sent to San Francisco to open a new Wolff's store. Bernie gets a new outlook on life when he meets little Jane O'Reilly, and soon after falls in love with her mother, Liz O'Reilly, a resident in California. After forming a relationship and marrying, Liz becomes pregnant with their first child, only to develop cancer shortly after the birth, given only a short amount of time to live. When Liz dies, Bernie is left with the responsibility of two children, and must take a new lease and have new experiences throughout his life.
