= Robert J. Steinmiller Jr. =

American actor (born 1978)

- Born: July 29, 1978 (age 47); Pittsburgh, Pennsylvania, U.S.
- Other name: Bob Steinmiller
- Years active: 1989–present
- Notable work: Bingo

Robert J. Steinmiller Jr. (born July 29, 1978) is an American actor.

Steinmiller was born in Pittsburgh, Pennsylvania, the son of Stephanie, who works for municipal parks, and Robert J. Steinmiller Sr., who manages a tire store. Steinmiller grew up in Schaumburg, Illinois. He began his acting career in 1989 in the theatrical production of Les Misérables. Steinmiller went on to star in films in the early 1990s, including Jack the Bear (for which he received a Young Artist Award nomination), Bingo, Rudy and The Ref. He appeared on TV in McDonald's commercials and an episode of The Untouchables.

In 2001, Steinmiller returned to the stage again in Damn Yankees at the Madrid Theatre, Los Angeles, United States. Most recently, Steinmiller starred in the Los Angeles production of Bye Bye Birdie at the Madrid Theatre, playing the role of Hugo Peabody.
