= Secret Adventures =

American Christian television series

- VHS Cover of the episode "Shrug"
- Genre: Children, Family, Educational
- Created by: George Taweel; Rob Loos
- Written by: George Taweel; Rob Loos
- Directed by: Jim Drake
- Starring: Tamara Daniels; Michele Scarabelli; Gary Bayer; Sarah Martineck; Michael MacLeod
- Composer: James Covell
- Country of origin: United States
- Original language: English
- No. of episodes: 7

Production
- Executive producer: Dan Johnson
- Producers: George Taweel; Rob Loos
- Running time: 30 minutes
- Production companies: Broadman & Holman Publishers; Taweel-Loos and Company

Original release
- Release: 1993 – 1995

Secret Adventures is an American Christian television series created by George Taweel and Rob Loos. It was released between 1993 and 1995 as direct-to-video VHS tapes spanning seven half-hour episodes.

The series concerns teenager Drea Thomas, who has an overactive imagination. She baby-sits Rebecca and Matt, and they learn moral lessons in their everyday lives. At least once per episode, they go on a "secret adventure" and are magically transformed into animated characters. There, they usually learn an important life lesson relevant to the framing real-world plot.

== Premise ==
The series takes place in Hampton Falls, New Jersey, roughly half-way between New York City and Philadelphia, as a fictional stand-in for Princeton, New Jersey. The local students go to Hampton Falls Junior High School where Mrs. Joan Long is the school principal. There Drea Thomas and her friends Kim and George, and her adversaries Arlene and Marcy, contend with the seventh grade. Drea babysits Mrs. Long's two children Rebecca and Matt, who are in elementary school.

Each episode uses Grandpa as the framing device to drive home the moral lesson of the episode. Drea often narrates to her "E.D." or electronic diary, to provide additional context for the audience. Each group of characters acts out a plot based on learning the moral lesson that is relevant to them. The "secret adventure" segment is a short animated vignette where Drea, Rebecca, and Matt are magically converted into animated characters; it is implied that they use their imagination. In these adventures, they usually are turned into anthropomorphic animals and encounter situations that clarify the moral lesson of the episode.

For example, in "Spin," an episode about telling the truth, Drea runs for class president but in order to win against the popular Arlene, she must bend the truth and outright lie to gain an advantage. Meanwhile, Matt gets paint on Dad's sheet music and instead of speaking up for his mistake, he hides it. The next day Drea finds the ruined music in his bag. Drea, Matt, and Rebecca go on a secret adventure to become fish, showing how lies can have consequences. This encourages Matt and Drea to tell the truth in their respective stories.

At the conclusion of the episode, Drea and Grandpa complete the framing device and explicitly state the moral lesson. Not all episodes have an explicit Christian message, but if there is one, usually Grandpa will state that connection in the conclusion.

Drea has an active imagination and everyday objects often become alive and react to her situation. These effects are usually achieved with computer animation. Her Toaster, for example, is alive and talks to her. It is mentioned in the first episode that Rebecca and Matt can see these animations, but the other characters cannot.

== Cast ==
=== Thomas Family ===
- Tamara Daniels as Andrea 'Drea' Thomas: the protagonist of the series. She is a 13-year-old girl in junior high. She babysits for the Long siblings.
- Michele Scarabelli as Laurie 'Mom' Thomas: Drea's mother. She works as a marketing manager for a local department store Jamison's.
- Gary Bayer as Jim 'Dad' Thomas: Drea's father. He is a music professor, though it is not specified at what institution.
- George Murdock as Ben 'Grandpa' Thomas: Drea's grandfather and Jim's father. He is often the framing device of each episode and is often found gardening. He also acts as a moral center for Drea.

=== Long Family ===
- Clare Kirkconnell as Mrs. Joan Long: The Principal of Hampton Falls Junior High. She is a single mother to Rebecca and Matt after their dad moves away to another state.
- Sarah Martineck as Rebecca Long: a young girl whom Drea babysits. She is constantly picks on her little brother, Matt.
- Michael MacLeod as Matt Long: a young boy whom Drea babysits. Matt is in the first grade.
- Doug Barr as John Long: Rebecca and Matt's dad who moved away to another state before the series started. He is shown briefly in a flashback in "Split" when the children contemplate the loss of their dad.

=== Hampton Falls Junior High ===
- Heidi Lucas as Kimberly Andow: Drea's best friend.
- Ian Christopher Scott as George Easton: Drea's love interest. He competes with Drea for a biology internship.
- Marnette Patterson as Arlene Blake: The most popular girl in school. She is generally mean-spirited toward Drea, functioning as her rival. She has voluminous blond hair and a high fashion sense.
- Frankie Ingrassia as Marcy Manmington: Arlene's friend and sidekick. She is often seen carrying things for Arlene and always by her side.

=== Animated Characters ===
- Jerry Houser as the voice of Mister Toaster: a chrome-plated toaster in Drea's kitchen. He often adds humorous commentary on the plot of the episode.
  - Also the voice of Morton Mouse, Esq.: an animated mouse appeared in Snag.
- Alan Johnson as the voice of The Shakespearean Fox: an animated fox found in Shrug. He speaks with fragments of Shakespeare quotes, often adapting them to the given situation.

=== Guest Characters ===
- Michael W. Smith as Billy Holden: a famous rock-star piano-player and singer. Jim Thomas was his piano teacher when Billy was young. In "Shrug" Billy plays a song he wrote for Jim about believing in himself.
- A.C. Green as himself: professional basketball player for the Phoenix Suns. He gives Drea encouragement in "Slam."
- Cheryl Miller as Polly Robinson: the new girls basketball coach in "Slam." She is kind but pushes the girls hard in tryouts and insists on only taking the best girls for the basketball team.
- John Tesh as himself: a TV reporter who briefly interviews Drea before the upcoming election in "Spin."
- Christopher Castile as himself: In "Split" the Thomas family meets him in Hollywood while attending a taping of his new sitcom. Jim Thomas breaks the fourth wall mentioning to his wife "Wasn't he in Beethoven?" Castile would also be well known to the intended audience of the show as he was a co-star on the sitcom Step by Step and a few years later would become a recurring voice actor on Adventures in Odyssey, a very popular Christian radio show produced by Focus on the Family.

== Episodes ==
1. "Spin: Truth, Tubas and George Washington" - Kimberly signs up Drea to run for student class president. She learns about telling the truth instead of lying to succeed in the election. Matt and Rebecca inadvertently ruin some of Dad's sheet music with finger paint, and then try to hide it to avoid punishment. In the secret adventure, Drea, Rebecca, and Matt are transformed respectively into a dolphin, an angelfish, and a puffer fish. They encounter a clown fish who pretends to be a shark, scaring the others. But when a real shark appears, it chases after the clown fish showing consequences for his lie, roughly equivalent to The Boy Who Cried Wolf.
2. "Snap: How to Act Like a Responsible Almost-Adult" - Drea has plans to go shopping with Kim over the weekend but made a mistake on the dates. She has to babysit Rebecca, Matt, and their dog Floyd instead. Floyd is temperamental and wreaks havoc on the house, ruining an in-progress dining room renovation by Drea's parents. Floyd gets banished outside. Later, Matt notices Floyd has escaped and the trio, along with the help of George, go looking for him. In the process, Drea loses track of Matt and frantically looks for him. After he is found climbing in a tree, the trio go on a secret adventure, becoming dogs so they can "think" like Floyd and find him. In the scene, they rescue a baby who is in a runaway baby carriage. The baby's mother thanks them and they learn the value of being responsible and doing the right thing. Back in the real world, Matt then realizes where Floyd went, to his litter of puppies next door; Matt notes that Floyd has new responsibilities, being a dad.
3. "Smash: How to Survive Junior High by Really Trying" - Hampton Falls Junior High's extracurricular activities budget has been cut by the school district. Drea and her friends attempt various methods of raising the needed $10,000, but have little success. Drea attempts to ask Arlene's grandfather Duke to donate the money, but Arlene rebuffs her. Drea finally tries to win a local radio codebreaking contest to win the money for the school. Drea, Rebecca, and Matt go on a secret adventure where they learn the value of teamwork and cooperation to escape and capture a leopard as respective jungle animals: a giraffe, an elephant, and a monkey. After the radio show gives out the final clue, the whole Thomas family, along with Duke, who is one of Grandpa's old school friends, work together to come up with the code word, which happens to be "Teamwork," but another caller gives the correct answer first. Later at school, Duke decides to donate the $10,000 to the school and makes a pledge to match any money raised by Arlene and Drea together.
4. "Shrug: The Self-Doubting Thomas" - In the fall, Drea is attempting to grow pumpkins in the garden, but they are quite misshapen and small. Drea is disappointed, but Grandpa suggests they should be cooked into a pumpkin pie. Drea is waiting for a decision on her joining an Environmental Society internship. George competes for that same spot and ultimately is chosen, to Drea's chagrin. She also wants to go to the Billy Holden concert but is unable to get tickets further discouraging her. In the meantime, Mom experiences self-doubt after she loses her corporate job at Jamison's. Matt is learning karate but was beat up by a girl at school embarrassing him. Drea, Rebecca, and Matt go on a secret adventure as skunks. They encounter a fox being chased by hounds in a foxhunt. They are cornered by a cliff but the trio figure out how to solve their problem, by spraying the dogs with their stinky liquid. They learn that everyone has a purpose, even animals who are very stinky. Later, Mom learns that her firing was a computer error and she gets her job back and a promotion to Assistant Vice President. Drea forgives George for taking her spot. Billy Holden shows up to visit Jim Thomas at the Thomas house. Jim used to be Billy's piano teacher and he offers to play a song he wrote for Jim about believing in himself.
5. "Snag: I'm Dreaming of a Right Christmas" - At Christmastime, the Thomas family decides to only buy one special gift for each other. Drea also buys a special gift for her rival Arlene. Meanwhile, the Mrs. Long tells her children that there will be fewer gifts this year due to financial constraints, and the children come to terms with it. Drea, Rebecca, and Matt go on a secret adventure, as mice. They meet a poor cockney mouse who invites them to share in their Christmas dinner. The trio learn the value of giving and how people can be happy even without material possessions.
6. "Slam: Full Court Perseverance" - Drea and Kim try out for the school basketball team, but Drea has doubts she can make the cut. After a first day of tryouts go poorly, Drea plans on quitting. Her parents train with her and encourage her to keep going. Meanwhile, Rebecca and Matt are trying to come up with a topic for a recycling project for school, and Dad is experiencing writer's block in his latest composition. In a secret adventure, the trio are transported to the Arctic as penguins. They encounter a polar bear who plans on eating them, but he strikes a deal for them to race him to the south pole, or be eaten. The penguins face obstacles but persist and eventually reach the South Pole. They learn the value of never giving up. The next day, Drea goes to the second day of tryouts, a scrimmage match between all the prospective players. She scores the winning three-pointer and makes the team. Rebecca and Matt come up with the idea for their school project and Dad's new composition: musical instruments made out of recycled trash.
7. "Split: Loss and Found" - Drea's Dad gets a job offer to teach music at the "California University." (Probably analogous to UCLA.) The Thomas' travel to Los Angeles for Jim's final interview and to get to know the city. In preparation for Drea's cross-country move, Rebecca and Matt now have Arlene as babysitter. They go on a secret adventure as caterpillars who turn into butterflies, showing how loss and sacrifice is necessary for beneficial change to occur. George also visits Drea, clearly upset at her moving, and kisses Drea. Grandpa tells Jim that he can't give up his life in Hampton Falls and won't go with the family to the west coast. Jim later tells the family his decision, impressed with all their sacrifices for his career. He decides to turn down the offer and they stay in New Jersey.

== Production ==
The series was filmed at the CBS Studios Center in Studio City, Los Angeles, California. Exterior school scenes were shot at John Burroughs Middle School in Los Angeles. Second unit scenes were also filmed in Princeton, New Jersey. Holder Hall's gothic tower at Rockefeller College features prominently. StarToons produced the animated sequences. Peter Baldwin, known for his works on Deep Space Nine and Lois and Clark, directed the series.

== Release ==
In 1997, the series of videos were re-released with branding by The Family Channel and distributed by Columbia TriStar Home Video. This release dropped the "s verb" titles in favor of more direct references to the moral lesson of each episode. The series, as of 2020, was formerly available for streaming on Pure Flix, however as of 2023 it has been removed. The full series of videos have since been uploaded to YouTube.
