= Arlyn Phoenix =

American activist

- Born: Arlyn Sharon Dunetz; December 31, 1944 (age 81); New York City, U.S.
- Other name: Heart Phoenix
- Occupation: Activist
- Spouses: John Lee Bottom (m. 1968; div. 1997) Jeffrey Weisberg (m. 2001)
- Children: River; Rain; Joaquin; Liberty; Summer

Arlyn Sharon Phoenix (née Dunetz; born December 31, 1944), commonly known as Heart Phoenix, is an American social activist and mother of actors River, Rain, Joaquin, Liberty, and Summer Phoenix.

== Early life ==
Arlyn Phoenix was born on December 31, 1944, in The Bronx, New York City, the daughter of Margaret (née Lefkowitz; 1916–1998) and Meyer Dunetz (1910–1996). Arlyn was raised with her two sisters, Rhoda and Merle (Sun). Her mother's family was of Hungarian-Jewish origins whilst her father's family was of Russian-Jewish extract. Although Arlyn's family was Jewish and celebrated Jewish culture and holidays, they did not attend to the synagogue.

== Adult life ==
Arlyn Phoenix left New York in 1968 and moved to California, where she met her future husband John Lee Bottom (1947–2015).

They traveled together along the West Coast, picking fruit and vegetables along the way, and their first son River was born August 23, 1970.

Soon after their first daughter Rain was born in 1972, they joined the religious group The Children of God and toured Mexico, Puerto Rico, and South America as missionaries of the cult for several years. It was during this time that their son and daughter Joaquin and Liberty (Libertad) were born. Arlyn and John renamed themselves for a brief period, taking the biblical names Jochebed and Amram, respectively.

The couple eventually grew disillusioned with the Children of God and left in 1977. Arlyn later stated that she and her husband were opposed to the cult's increasingly distorted rules, particularly the practice of flirty fishing. They returned to the U.S. in late 1977 and lived in Winter Park, Florida, where Arlyn gave birth to her youngest child, Summer. Around this time, they legally adopted the surname Phoenix (Arlyn later changed her first name to Heart in 1988) and began to embrace veganism as their new diet and lifestyle.

The parents took their five children and headed back to California, where Arlyn got a job as an executive secretary for NBC. She later hired an agent, Iris Burton, who eventually got all of her children acting work. John and Arlyn divorced in 1997. She is now married to her second husband, Jeffrey Weisberg.

Phoenix was the executive director of The Florida School of Traditional Midwifery for five years, one of 10 accredited direct entry midwifery schools in the country.

In 2012, she co-founded the non-profit organization River Phoenix Center for Peacebuilding which provides and promotes the best practices and principles of peacebuilding and global sustainability.

She is on the Board of Directors of Peace Alliance, an organization which supports the creation of a United States Department of Peace.
