= Liberty Phoenix =

American actress (born 1976)

- Born: Libertad Mariposa Bottom; July 5, 1976 (age 50)
- Other name: Liberty Mariposa Phoenix
- Occupation: Actress
- Years active: 1982–1986
- Spouses: Ernesto Asch (m. 1996; div. 2004): Andy Lord
- Children: 5
- Mother: Arlyn Phoenix
- Relatives: River Phoenix (brother); Rain Phoenix (sister); Joaquin Phoenix (brother); Summer Phoenix (sister)

Liberty Mariposa Phoenix (née Bottom; July 5, 1976) is an American former actress and musician and current apparel designer. She is the older sister of Summer Phoenix and the younger sister of River Phoenix, Rain Phoenix, and Joaquin Phoenix.

== Early life ==
Her mother, Arlyn Sharon (née Dunetz), was born in New York to Jewish parents of Russian-Jewish and Hungarian-Jewish origins. Her father, John Lee Bottom, was from California and has English, German, and French ancestry.

== Career ==
Between 1982 and 1986, Phoenix appeared in two TV productions. The two productions were Kate's Secret and Seven Brides for Seven Brothers episode "Christmas Song", after which she stopped acting.

She founded a punk band with her sisters Rain and Summer Phoenix, called The Causey Way, which no longer exists. However, she occasionally supported Rain's band the Papercranes with her backup vocals.

She later taught at the Florida School of Traditional Midwifery.

In 2005, Phoenix designed a line of dresses and skirts, selling them to Some Odd Rubies, a boutique in Manhattan. In March 2007, she opened her own eco-friendly Indigo Green Store in Gainesville, Florida.

== Personal life ==
Phoenix works for the organization River Phoenix Center for Peacebuilding, which was founded by her mother.

== Filmography ==
Year	Title	Role	Notes
1982	Seven Brides for Seven Brothers	Christie	TV series, episode: "Christmas Song"
1986	Kate's Secret	Brownie Scout	TV movie
