= Aleka's Attic =

Alternative rock band

- Origin: Gainesville, Florida, United States
- Genres: Alternative rock, folk rock, garage rock revival
- Years active: 1987–1992
- Past members: River Phoenix; Rain Phoenix; Tim Hankins; Josh Greenbaum; Josh McKay; Sasa Hasid Raphael
- Website: Alekas Attic at Myspace

Aleka's Attic was an alternative folk/rock band from Gainesville, Florida, formed by River Phoenix and Josh Greenbaum in April 1987.

== History ==
The original line up of Aleka's Attic included River Phoenix as lead singer and guitarist, his sister Rain on vocals and occasional percussion, Tim Hankins on viola, Josh McKay on bass and Josh Greenbaum on drums.

The band's name comes from the fictional Aleka, a poet-philosopher who gathered friends in his attic to discuss his ideas. When Aleka dies, his friends form a band to share his beliefs with others through music.

River was offered a two-year development deal with Island Records to develop the band and record a marketable album, which was not accomplished in the time allotted due to River's ongoing film schedule. Island Records opted out of the deal based on their belief that the material lacked marketability. River decided to record the album independently.

== The unreleased album ==
Though Rain spent two years working through unfinished tracks and mixing performances, no finished product was ever completed. The release of the album, with the proposed titles Never Odd Or Even and Zero, was postponed indefinitely due to River's death. The Phoenix family continues to work toward an official release.

An original track list for bootlegs of Zero/Never Odd Or Even:

1. Alone We Elope
2. Below Beloved
3. Bliss Is...
4. Dog God
5. Get Anything
6. Note To A Friend
7. Safety Pins and Army Boots
8. Scales & Fishnails
9. Senile Felines
10. You're So Ostentatious

In 1997, Phoenix's friend Michael Stipe of R.E.M. bought the rights to all of Aleka's Attic's material from Island Records.

Homemade versions of an album and many other songs by the band can be found on various sites throughout the internet.

In the film Sneakers, whose cast includes Aleka's Attic member River Phoenix, the character played by Dan Aykroyd wears an Aleka's Attic T-shirt in one scene.

In December 2018, Rain Phoenix announced on Instagram that Aleka's Attic singles would be released in 2019 with the album being released eventually.

Red Hot Chili Peppers bassist Flea appeared on two unreleased Aleka's Attic songs to mark River Phoenix's 50th birthday.

In July 2020, it was reported that Aleka's Attic heavily influenced a novel by British novelist Guy Mankowski, titled "Dead Rock Stars".

== Released tracks ==
- The group sold tapes between 1989 and 1990 with the songs "Goldmine", "Too Many Colors", "Across The Way" and "Blue Period".
- "Across The Way", which was written by River and Josh McKay, was included on the 1989 PETA benefit album Tame Yourself.
- "Note To A Friend", featuring River's friend Michael "Flea" Balzary of the Red Hot Chili Peppers on bass, was released on the 1996 compilation 'In Defense Of Animals: Volume II'
- The song "Too Many Colors", was featured on the unreleased soundtrack of "My Own Private Idaho", a 1991 film starring River Phoenix and Keanu Reeves, directed by Gus Van Sant.
- The songs "Where I’d Gone" and "Scales & Fishnails" were released on the album "Time Gone" by Rain Phoenix in 2019. Next to this the song "Time is the Killer" by Rain Phoenix and Michael Stipe was also released on the album.
- "Senile Felines" was published in 2010 on the album Tiny Idols Volume III by Snowglobe Records.
- The song "In The Corner Dunce" was released in January 2019 by the label LaunchLeft.
- On August 23, 2020, the label LaunchLeft released the songs "Alone U Elope" and "2x4" in commemoration of River Phoenix's 50th birthday.

== Other tracks ==
- Too Many Colors - 5:24
- Goldmine - 5:26
- Where I'd Gone - 3:17 (solo version by River Phoenix)
- Get Anything - 3:52
- Note to a Friend - 1:11
- Below Beloved - 3:56
- Popular Thinks (Live) - 2:13
- You're so Ostentatious - 2:42
- In The Corner Dunce - 3:41
- Scales and Fish-nails - 0:41
- Across the Way - 4:58
- Senile Felines - 4:40
- Safety Pins and Army Boots - 1:49
- Dog God - 3:28
- Bliss is... - 3:38
- Blue Period - 5:15
- Alone we Elope (Hidden Track) - 3:14
