= Iris Burton =

American dancer and talent agent

- Born: Iris Burstein; September 4, 1930; Manhattan, New York City, U.S.
- Died: April 5, 2008 (aged 77); Los Angeles, California, U.S.
- Occupations: Dancer; Talent agent
- Spouse: Sidney Miller (m. 1956; div. 1967)
- Children: Barry Miller

Iris Burton (born Iris Burstein; September 4, 1930 – April 5, 2008) was an American dancer and talent agent, who discovered and represented many famous child actors during her career.

== Early career ==
Burton danced in the Broadway shows Music in My Heart (1947) and Pardon Our French (1950). She also danced on television, earning $125 per week in 1951 for performing on Milton Berle's program. In the early 1950s, she moved to Hollywood, appearing as a dancer in several films such as Top Banana (1954) and The Ten Commandments (1956).

Tony Award-winning actor Barry Miller (Saturday Night Fever, Fame) is Burton's son from her brief marriage to actor/director Sidney Miller.

== Later career ==
Burton began her agency in 1977, becoming one of the few women at high levels in talent agencies. She was well known for discovering the Phoenix brothers (River and Joaquin), and their sisters (Rain, Liberty, and Summer) whom she spotted singing for spare change in Westwood, Los Angeles. She worked with River throughout his short career.

Burton and her relationship with Greg Sestero is described in a chapter of Sestero's 2013 memoir The Disaster Artist. Sestero portrays Burton as a warm, quick-witted agent who took on representing him despite his lack of experience and ultimately led him to his first big roles. This chapter was dramatized briefly in the 2017 film adaptation of the book, with Burton portrayed by Sharon Stone.

== Death ==
Iris Burton died on April 5, 2008, aged 77, from pneumonia and complications of Alzheimer's disease in Woodland Hills, California at the Motion Picture and Television Country House.
