= Seven Brides for Seven Brothers (disambiguation) =

Seven Brides for Seven Brothers is a 1954 musical film.

Seven Brides for Seven Brothers may also refer to:

- Seven Brides for Seven Brothers (musical), a 1978 stage adaptation of the film
- Seven Brides for Seven Brothers (TV series), first broadcast in 1982
