= Barry Miller (actor) =

American actor (born 1958)

- Born: February 6, 1958 (age 68); Los Angeles, California
- Occupation: Actor
- Years active: 1973–present
- Parents: Sidney Miller (father); Iris Burton (mother)

Barry Miller (born February 6, 1958) is an American actor. He won Broadway's 1985 Tony Award as Best Actor (Featured Role - Play) for his performance in Biloxi Blues. He was nominated for a Golden Globe Award for Best Supporting Actor in a Series, Limited Series, or Motion Picture Made for Television in 1991 for his role in Equal Justice.

== Early life ==
Miller was born at Cedars of Lebanon Hospital in Los Angeles, California to Sidney Miller, an actor, director, and writer, and Iris Burton, an agent. He attended Fairfax High School.

== Career ==
In addition to Biloxi Blues, Miller acted on Broadway in Crazy He Calls Me (1992).

He had roles in Saturday Night Fever, Fame, and Peggy Sue Got Married.

One of his film roles was playing Reuven Malter in 1981's The Chosen.

== Filmography ==
- The Waltons (1973) (TV) - Craska
- Brock's Last Case (1973) (TV movie) - Staats
- Shazam! (1974-1975) (TV) - Mike
- Joe and Sons (1975-1976) (TV series) - Mark Vitale
- Lepke (1975) - Young Lepke
- Adam-12 (1975) (TV) - Tom Bell
- The Secrets of Isis (1976) (TV)
- Having Babies (1976) (TV) - Kenneth McNamara
- The Death of Richie (1977) (TV) - Domenic
- Szysznyk (1977) (TV) - Fortwengler
- Saturday Night Fever (1977) - Bobby C.
- Kojak (1977) (TV) - Billy Sherback
- Wonder Woman (1979) (TV) - Barney
- Voices (1979) - Raymond Rothman
- Fame (1980) - Ralph
- The Chosen (1981) - Reuven Malter
- King of America (1982) (TV)
- The Roommate (1985) (TV)
- The Journey of Natty Gann (1985) - Parker
- Peggy Sue Got Married (1986) - Richard Norvik
- Conspiracy: The Trial of the Chicago 8 (1987) (TV movie) - Jerry Rubin
- The Sicilian (1987) - Dr. Nattore
- The Last Temptation of Christ (1988) - Jeroboam
- Love at Large (1990) - Marty
- Equal Justice (1990) (TV) - Pete 'Briggs' Brigman
- The Pickle (1993) - Ronnie Liebowitz
- Love Affair (1994) - Robert Crosley
- NYPD Blue (1994) (TV)
- The Practice (1997) (TV) - Douglas Colson
- Ally McBeal (1998) (TV) Happy Birthday Baby - Mark Henderson
- Flawless (1999) - Leonard Wilcox
- Shortcut to Happiness (2007) - Mike Weiss
