= Sidney Miller (actor) =

American actor, director and songwriter (1916–2004)

Sidney L. Miller
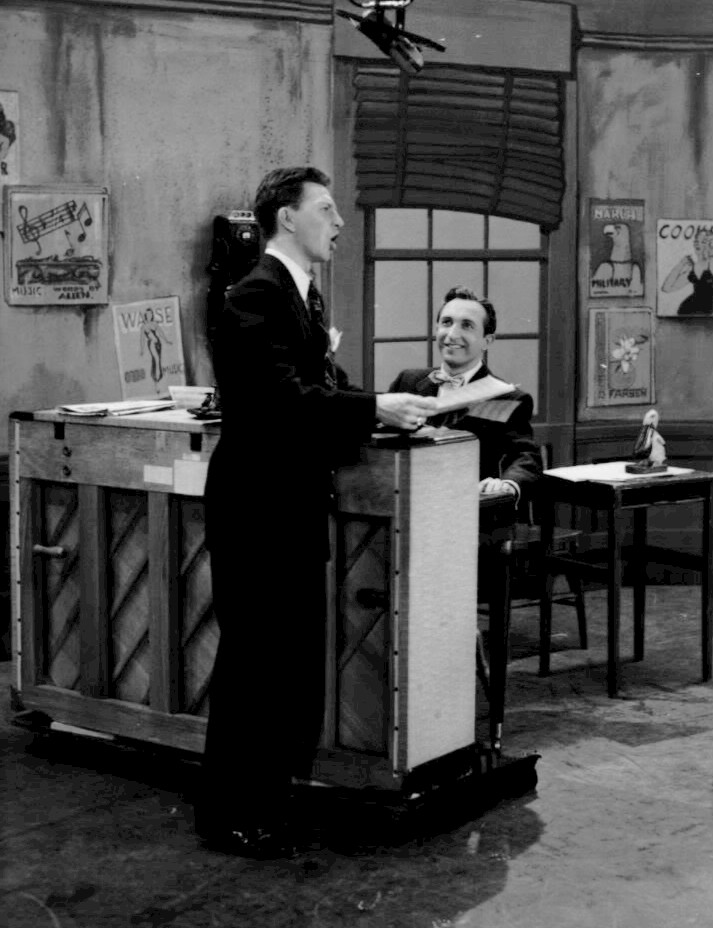
- Miller (at piano) performing with Donald O'Connor on The Colgate Comedy Hour (1952)
- Born: Sid Miller; October 22, 1916; Shenandoah, Pennsylvania, U.S.
- Died: January 10, 2004 (aged 87); Los Angeles, California, U.S.
- Occupations: Actor, television director, writer, songwriter
- Years active: 1931–1997
- Known for: The Donald O'Connor Show; Dungeons & Dragons
- Spouses: Iris Burton (m. 1956; div. 1967) Dorothy Green (m. 1967–1984) June Rohlrlick (m. 1994)
- Children: 4, including Barry Miller

Sidney L. Miller (born Sid Miller; October 22, 1916 – January 10, 2004) was an American actor, director and songwriter. He had supporting roles in Hollywood movies from the 1930s until the 1980s, appeared on radio and television, and directed television shows. In 1959, he directed the films The 30 Foot Bride of Candy Rock (1959) and Get Yourself a College Girl (1964). He also played piano and wrote songs for use in films.

== Biography ==
Sid Miller was born in Shenandoah, Pennsylvania. His first credited acting role was in his early teens in Merrily Yours, a Shirley Temple short (1932). Within his first year of screen appearances he became established as a scene-stealing juvenile, usually affecting a Jewish dialect for comic effect. Among his earliest credits are Three on a Match and Penguin Pool Murder (both 1932). He also appeared in three of Educational Pictures' "Frolics of Youth" comedy shorts, which featured the up-and-coming Shirley Temple.

Sidney Miller became close friends with Mickey Rooney. Miller had a small role as would-be wrestling announcer Mo Kahn in Rooney's Boys Town (1938), and reprised the character in the sequel, Men of Boys Town (1941). Rooney soon gave Miller roles in his teenage musicals such as Rooney's orchestra leader in Babes in Arms (1939).

In 1941 Miller became the second lead in Columbia's collegiate comedy series The Glove Slingers, and he remained with the short-subject series until it lapsed in 1943. Miller was also a member of Universal's teenage stock company. While at Universal he befriended Donald O'Connor and contributed to O'Connor's musicals, both as songwriter and performer. Miller played comic sidekicks in Monogram's budget musical and comedy features. His only solo featured spot of the 1940s is as a specialty act in Universal's Babes on Swing Street (1945), in which nightclub emcee Miller does celebrity impersonations of Walter Winchell, Edward G. Robinson, and even Katharine Hepburn. When the Hollywood studios curtailed low-budget production after World War II, Miller concentrated on radio and the new medium of television.

== Broadcasting ==
In 1937, he made his radio debut on the Jack Benny Program episode "Christmas Shopping", as a man whom Benny mistakes for a department store floorwalker. The actor was also a regular performer on Cavalcade of America, Suspense and Nightbeat.

He co-starred and co-directed, alongside Donald O'Connor, in one of the first musical sitcoms on television, The Donald O'Connor Show. After joining Disney, he wrote for and directed The Mickey Mouse Club (1955).

Miller directed episodes of numerous successful television programs throughout the 1950s and 1960s, including Damon Runyon Theater, Bachelor Father, Get Smart, Bewitched, The Ann Sothern Show and My Mother the Car. (He had been a regular on Sothern's radio show The Adventures of Maisie.)

== Songwriting ==
Recorded examples of Miller's songwriting include Have a heart (1939), Loves' got nothing on me (1941), My fickle eye (1946), OK'l baby dok'l (1947) What do I have to do (to make you love me) (1947), (It only takes) a little imagination (1947), Walk it off (1947), Lora-Belle Lee (1949), and Duke Ellington's version of Come to baby, do! (1945).

== Return to acting ==
Although Sidney Miller remained an established director through 1990, he did accept character roles in movies and television. In 1958, he played Roscoe Dewitt, an impressionist who bothers Bob Collins in The Bob Cummings Show episode "Bob Judges a Beauty Pageant". In 1968's Yours, Mine and Ours, he played Doctor Ashford, Lucille Ball's date who was shorter than her three children. For the 1970 Jerry Lewis military comedy Which Way to the Front?, a broad burlesque of the German high command, Lewis cast Sidney Miller as a comic Adolf Hitler. In 1974, Miller appeared briefly as a drunk driver in the Barbra Streisand comedy For Pete's Sake as well as episodes of "Dragnet" and "Adam-12."

In 1980, Miller reunited with Donald O'Connor had a nightclub show described as "a fast-paced vaudeville act" that they performed in cities including Denver, New Orleans, Philadelphia, and San Francisco.

From 1983 to 1985, Miller played the voice of Dungeon Master in the animated series Dungeons & Dragons, which was based on the role-playing game of the same name.

Miller also provided voices for animated characters in The Smurfs, Challenge of the Go-Bots, and Scooby-Doo.

In the 1980s and 1990s, he had a small role as Slow-Burn in the 1988 Billy Crystal film Memories of Me, appeared as Sol on The Father Dowling Mysteries episode "The Confidence Mystery" in 1990, and dubbed the voice of Oompe for the 1992 American version of Little Nemo: Adventures in Slumberland. He had retired by the late 1990s.

== Personal life and death ==
He was married three times, and had an actor son, Barry Miller, from his marriage to Iris Burton. Miller died in Los Angeles from Parkinson's disease on January 10, 2004. His resting place is in Hollywood Forever Cemetery.

== Selected filmography ==
=== As actor ===
- 1932: Merrily Yours as Harry's Stooge
- 1932: Symphony of Six Million as Magnus - as a Boy (uncredited)
- 1932: Forgotten Commandments as Student (uncredited)
- 1932: Lady and Gent as Member of 8th Grade Graduating Class (uncredited)
- 1932: Three on a Match as Willie Goldberg (uncredited)
- 1932: The Penguin Pool Murder as Isadore Marks - Student with Glasses (uncredited)
- 1932: Lawyer Man as Boy Behind Olga at End (uncredited)
- 1933: Hard to Handle as Boy on Pier (uncredited)
- 1933: The Mayor of Hell as Izzy
- 1933: Mary Stevens, M.D. as Sanford Nussbaum (uncredited)
- 1933: This Day and Age as Harold Miller (uncredited)
- 1933: Rafter Romance as Julius
- 1933: Wild Boys of the Road as Boy Selling Letter (uncredited)
- 1933: East of Fifth Avenue as Messenger (uncredited)
- 1934: The Big Shakedown as Boy Buying Ice Cream (uncredited)
- 1934: Hi, Nellie! as Louie (uncredited)
- 1934: The Show-Off as Gatekeeper at Box Factory (uncredited)
- 1934: Harold Teen as Sugar Bowl Patron (uncredited)
- 1934: The Hell Cat as Copy Boy (uncredited)
- 1934: Our Daily Bread as Cohen's Son (uncredited)
- 1934: Desirable as First Western Union Messenger (uncredited)
- 1934: When Strangers Meet as Leon Rosinsky
- 1934: One Hour Late as Orville (uncredited)
- 1934: The Band Plays On as Rosy as a Boy
- 1935: Dinky as Sammy
- 1935: The Girl Who Came Back as Boy (uncredited)
- 1935: Silk Hat Kid as George Washington (uncredited)
- 1936: The Little Red Schoolhouse as Sidney Levy
- 1936: One Rainy Afternoon as Doorman (uncredited)
- 1936: The Bride Walks Out as Second Florist Delivery Boy (uncredited)
- 1936: Women Are Trouble as Copy Boy (uncredited)
- 1936: Piccadilly Jim as Messenger Boy (uncredited)
- 1936: Stage Struck as Wilbur's Friend (uncredited)
- 1936: Cain and Mabel as Call Boy (uncredited)
- 1937: The Big Shot as Newsboy (uncredited)
- 1938: Reckless Living as Jockey (uncredited)
- 1938: Boys Town as Mo Kahn
- 1938: Cipher Bureau as Jimmy
- 1939: Scouts to the Rescue as Hermie - a Boy Scout
- 1939: Panama Patrol as Jimmy, Office Boy
- 1939: Streets of New York as Jiggsy
- 1939: Andy Hardy Gets Spring Fever as Sidney
- 1939: Babes in Arms as Sid (uncredited)
- 1939: What a Life as Pinkie Peters
- 1939: 20,000 Men a Year as Irving Glassman
- 1940: Golden Gloves as Sammy Sachs
- 1940: City for Conquest as Band Conductor and Emcee (uncredited)
- 1940: Strike Up the Band as Sid - a Student (uncredited)
- 1940: Little Nellie Kelly as Boy at Dance (uncredited)
- 1941: Men of Boys Town as Mo Kahn
- 1941: Life Begins for Andy Hardy as Young Man at Hotel (uncredited)
- 1941: Henry Aldrich for President as Sidney
- 1941: Melody Lane as Page Boy (uncredited)
- 1941: Babes on Broadway as Tony (uncredited)
- 1942: Don't Get Personal as Elevator Boy (uncredited)
- 1942: Mr. Wise Guy as Charlie Horse
- 1942: Alias Boston Blackie as Herman - Bellhop (uncredited)
- 1942: Syncopation as Herbert (uncredited)
- 1942: Private Buckaroo as Jeep Driver (uncredited)
- 1942: Get Hep to Love as Boy Waiter (uncredited)
- 1942: Madame Spy as Newsboy (uncredited)
- 1942: When Johnny Comes Marching Home as Hot-Dog Vendor (uncredited)
- 1943: It Comes Up Love as Page Boy (uncredited)
- 1943: Hi Diddle Diddle as Benny (uncredited)
- 1943: Top Man as Higgins - Soda Jerk (uncredited)
- 1943: Here Comes Kelly as Sammy Cohn
- 1943: Moonlight in Vermont as Cyril
- 1944: Chip Off the Old Block as Soda Clerk (uncredited)
- 1944: Hi, Good Lookin'! as Messenger Boy (uncredited)
- 1944: Hot Rhythm as Sammy Rubin
- 1944: Wing and a Prayer, The Story of Carrier X as Sailor (uncredited)
- 1945: Babes on Swing Street as Corny Panatowsky
- 1945: She Gets Her Man as Boy
- 1945: There Goes Kelly as Sammy Cohn
- 1945: Patrick the Great as Tony (uncredited)
- 1945: The Horn Blows at Midnight as Trumpet Player (uncredited)
- 1945: On Stage Everybody as Radio Announcer (uncredited)
- 1948: The Judge Steps Out as Newsboy (uncredited)
- 1949: The Lucky Stiff as Bernstein
- 1952: The Sniper as Intern (uncredited)
- 1953: Walking My Baby Back Home as Walter Thomas
- 1954: Dragnet (TV Series)
- 1955: The Donald O'Connor Show (TV Series) as Minor Role
- 1958: The Bob Cummings Show (TV Series) as Roscoe Dewitt
- 1962: Experiment in Terror as The Drunk (uncredited)
- 1968: Yours, Mine and Ours as Dr. Ashford
- 1970: Which Way to the Front? as Adolf Hitler
- 1970-1974: Adam-12 (TV Series) as Man in Sewer / Marvin Weber / J. Simmons
- 1972: Everything You Always Wanted to Know About Sex* (*But Were Afraid to Ask) as George
- 1974: For Pete's Sake as Drunk Driver
- 1975: Marcus Welby, M.D. (TV Series) as Ben Leona
- 1975: Ellery Queen (TV Series) as Morgue Attendant
- 1977: The World's Greatest Lover as Man at the Table
- 1983: Star 80 as Nightclub Owner
- 1983–1985: Dungeons & Dragons (TV Series) as Dungeon Master (voice)
- 1984: The Challenge of the GoBots (TV Series) (voice)
- 1985-1986: Cagney & Lacey (TV Series) as Wino / Randolph
- 1986: Small Wonder (TV Series)
- 1986-1987: The Smurfs (TV Series) (voice)
- 1988: Memories of Me as Slow-Burn
- 1989: Little Nemo: Adventures in Slumberland as Oompe (voice)
- 1990: Father Dowling Mysteries (TV Series) as Sol

=== As director ===
- 1954–1955: The Donald O'Connor Show (TV series)
- 1955–1957: The Mickey Mouse Club (TV series)
- 1957: Walt Disney's Wonderful World of Color (TV series)
- 1958–1960: Bachelor Father (TV series)
- 1959: Cissie (unaired TV pilot)
- 1959: The 30 Foot Bride of Candy Rock
- 1959: Pontiac Star Parade (TV special)
- 1959–1961: The Ann Sothern Show (TV series)
- 1960: Peter Loves Mary (TV series)
- 1960: The Three Stooges Scrapbook (unaired TV pilot divided into two short films in 1963)
- 1963: My Favorite Martian (TV series)
- 1964: Get Yourself a College Girl
- 1965: Bewitched (TV series)
- 1965: McHale's Navy (TV series)
- 1965: Dr. Kildare (TV series)
- 1965: The Smothers Brothers Show (TV series)
- 1965: My Mother the Car (TV series)
- 1965: The Addams Family (TV series)
- 1965–1966: Please Don't Eat the Daisies (TV series)
- 1966: The Recruiters (unaired TV pilot)
- 1966: Honey West (TV series)
- 1967: The Monkees (TV series)
- 1967: Get Smart (TV series)
- 1977: The Skatebirds (TV series)

=== Composer and songwriter ===
- 1943: O, My Darling Clementine ("Diggin the Docey Doe")
- 1943: Moonlight in Vermont ("Something Tells Me", "Be A Good Girl", They Got Me in the Middle of Things", "Pickin' the Beets", "Dobbin and a Wagon of Hay", "After the Beat")
- 1944: This Is the Life ("Yippee-I-Voot", "Gremlin Walk")
- 1944: Follow the Boys ("Kittens With Their Mittens Laced")
- 1944: Hot Rhythm ("Shampoo Jingle")
- 1944: Hi, Good Lookin'! ("By Mistake")
- 1944: Chip Off the Old Block ("I've Gotta Give My Feet a Break")
- 1944: Sing a Jingle ("Sing a Jingle", "We're the Janes Who Make The Planes", "Mademoiselle")
