= Kate's Secret =

1986 American television film

- Opening title
- Genre: Drama
- Written by: Susan Seeger; Denise De Garmo
- Directed by: Arthur Allan Seidelman
- Starring: Meredith Baxter Birney; Ben Masters; Georgann Johnson; Tracy Nelson; Shari Belafonte; Leslie Bevis; Edward Asner; Mackenzie Phillips
- Music by: J. Peter Robinson
- Country of origin: United States
- Original language: English

Production
- Executive producer: Andrea Baynes
- Producer: Stephanie Austin
- Cinematography: Dennis Dalzell
- Editor: Millie Moore
- Running time: 96 minutes
- Production companies: Andrea Baynes Productions; Columbia Pictures Television

Original release
- Network: NBC
- Release: November 17, 1986

Kate's Secret is a 1986 American drama television film directed by Arthur Allan Seidelman, written by Susan Seeger and Denise De Garmo, and starring Meredith Baxter Birney, Ben Masters, Tracy Nelson, and Edward Asner. The story is about a seemingly "perfect" suburban housewife and mother who is secretly suffering from bulimia nervosa.

Kate's Secret aired on NBC on November 17, 1986.

The title and basic premise of the 2025 American satirical black comedy, Maddie's Secret is inspired by the film.

== Synopsis ==
To those on the outside, Kate Stark leads an idyllic life; a successful husband, an adoring daughter, and a beautiful home. But beneath the surface, her life is less than ideal; a husband preoccupied with his career, a critical and domineering mother, and a dark secret that not even her closest friends know: Kate is bulimic. As the pressures in her life begin to mount, Kate obsessively diets and exercises, and habitually binges and purges while adroitly hiding her eating disorder from all those around her. When Kate's bulimia eventually leads to a frightening accident that makes it clear to everyone that her illness is dangerous not only to herself, but to those closest to her, she is committed to rehabilitation in order to face the inner turmoil at the root of her disorder.

== Cast ==
Actor	Role
Meredith Baxter Birney	Kate Stark
Ben Masters	Jack Stark
Georgann Johnson	Faith
Tracy Nelson	Patch Reed
Shari Belafonte	Gail
Leslie Bevis	Monica Fields
Edward Asner	Dr. Resnick
Mackenzie Phillips	Deyna
Summer Phoenix	Becky Stark
Sharon Spelman	Liz Reed
Mindy Seeger	Markie
Isabel Grandin	Dot
Liz Torres	Laura
Gwynne Gilford	Lorna
Rosanna Huffman	Megan
Ron Asher	Teen at Pizza Parlor
Liberty Phoenix	Brownie Scout
