= The Donald O'Connor Show =

American television series

- Promotional poster for 1968 talk show
- Genre: Comedy; Variety
- Written by: Sidney Miller; Hal Fimberg
- Directed by: Donald O'Connor; Sidney Miller
- Starring: Donald O'Connor; Sidney Miller; Joyce Cunning; Olan Soule
- Composer: Walter Scharf
- Country of origin: United States
- Original language: English
- No. of seasons: 1
- No. of episodes: 19

Production
- Producer: Ernest D. Glicksman
- Camera setup: Multi-camera
- Running time: 25 minutes
- Production company: O'Connor Television

Original release
- Network: NBC
- Release: October 9, 1954 – September 10, 1955

The Donald O'Connor Show (also known as Here Comes Donald and The Donald O'Connor Show Texaco Show) is an American musical situation comedy television series starring singer/dancer Donald O'Connor. It appeared on NBC from October 9, 1954, to September 10, 1955. It aired bi-weekly on Saturdays at 9:30 pm ET, alternating with The Jimmy Durante Show.

== Synopsis ==
Two young songwriters, singer/dancer Donald O'Connor and his real-life songwriting partner Sid Miller, played versions of themselves as two men who were trying to make a name for themselves in show business. The series gave them a chance in each episode to do some singing and dancing. Joyce Cunning (also known by her married name Joyce Smight) played their secretary Doreen.

In 1968 Donald O'Connor hosted a syndicated talk show with the same title.
