= Peace Alliance =

Non-profit organization based in United States of America

The Peace Alliance/ The Peace Alliance Educational Institute
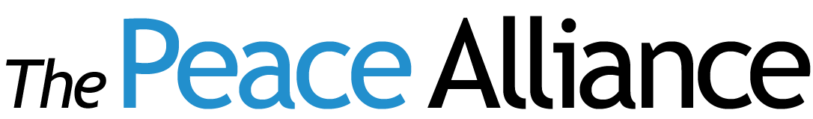
- Formation: 2004/2008 respectively
- Founded: 2004
- Founder: Marianne Williamson, Heart Phoenix, and others
- Type: 501(c)(4) and 501(c)(3)
- Location(s): Washington, D.C., 20001
- Managing Director: Diane Tate
- Key people: Judy Kimmel-Chair, Board of Directors, The Peace Alliance Terry Mason- Chair, Board of Directors, The Peace Alliance Educational Institute
- Website: https://www.peacealliance.org

The Peace Alliance is a nonprofit organization based in the United States that works on domestic and international peace building. The organization organizes Peace Alliance Action Teams within state congressional districts and also a Student Peace Alliance youth group.

== Mission ==
The mission of the Peace Alliance is to establish a culture of peace through civic engagement. Examples of their work include legislative efforts such as bills to establish a Department of Peace, and to address youth violence through the Youth PROMISE Act (S. 1318, H.R. 1307), as well as direct efforts within local communities to work on peaceful resolution of problems such as bullying in the schools, conflict resolution, and gang violence. Their overarching driving initiative is Be the Movement! Take a Step for Peace: In Your Life, In Our Communities, Among Nations. This initiative focuses on five key peacebuilding cornerstones: Empowering Community Peacebuilding; Teaching Peace in Schools; Humanizing Justice Systems; Cultivating Personal Peace; and Fostering International Peace.

== Recent events and activities ==
The Peace Alliance has launched a "Faces of Peace" campaign to highlight grassroots efforts at peacebuilding in local communities. Recent legislative efforts include: The Safe Schools Improvement Act (S.506 and H.R. 1648) to address bullying in schools; advocacy for international peacebuilding efforts within U.S. State Department and foreign operations funding appropriations; and legislation to establish a Department of Peace (H.R. 808).

== See also ==
- List of anti-war organizations
