= Papercranes =

American musical group

papercranes
- Origin: Gainesville, Florida
- Genres: Alternative rock
- Years active: 2004–present
- Label: Manimal Vinyl
- Members: Rain Phoenix; Michael Tubbs; Dave Lebleu; Andy Lord; Michael Amish; Robb Buono
- Website: papercranesmusic.com

papercranes is an American band based in Los Angeles which features actress and singer Rain Phoenix on vocals. Her younger sister Summer Phoenix also occasionally plays piano/keyboards with the band. Their debut full-length album was released in 2006.

== History ==
papercranes was formed in 2003 in Gainesville, Florida by actress and singer Rain Phoenix. They play mostly in and around the Gainesville area. They independently released their debut self-titled EP in 2004. Their debut full-length album, titled Vidalia, was released in September 2006. A tour followed. The band chronicled their tour escapades in video clips on their web site. A second album titled Let's Make Babies in the Woods was released in 2011 on Los Angeles indie label Manimal Vinyl. Their third album titled Three was released in November 2012 via Manimal.

=== Former and occasional band members ===
Aaron Kant, Peter Mcneal, Margaret Briggs, Alexis Fleisig, John Jackson, Norm Block, Jack Irons (drums)
Jason Chesney, Mike Rotolante, Daniel Green, Flea, Mark McAdam, Dan Komin (bass)
Mark McAdam, Kirk Hellie (guitar)
Summer Phoenix (piano/keyboard)
Amy Cavanaugh, Julia Kent, Dermot Mulroney (cello)
Scott McCaughey (pump organ)
Jason Borger (keyboards)
Michael Amish (programming/bass/keyboards/rhodes/wurlitzer/guitar)
Liberty Phoenix (backup vocals)

== Releases ==
- 2004 - Papercranes EP#1 (self-released)
- 2006 - Vidalia (self-released)
- 2011 - Let's Make Babies in the Woods (Manimal Vinyl)
- 2012 - Three (Manimal Vinyl)
