= River Phoenix =

American actor (1970–1993)

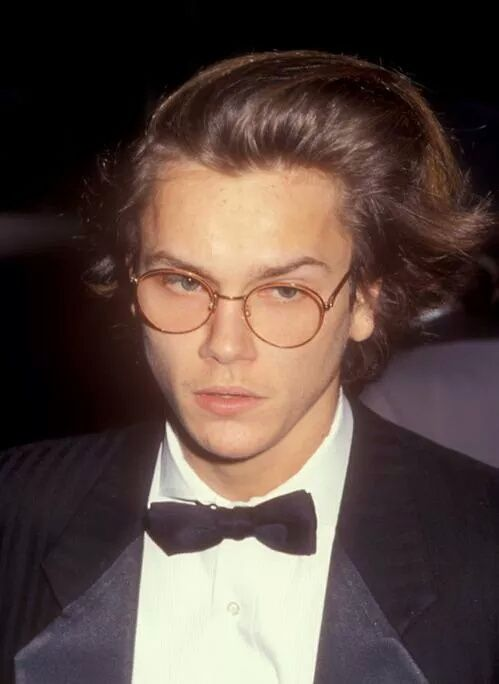
- Phoenix in 1989
- Born: River Jude Bottom; August 23, 1970; Madras, Oregon, U.S.
- Died: October 31, 1993 (aged 23); Los Angeles, California, U.S.
- Cause of death: Acute multiple drug intoxication (i.e. toxicity)
- Resting place: Cremated; ashes scattered at family ranch in Micanopy, Florida
- Occupations: Actor; singer; songwriter
- Years active: 1982–1993
- Mother: Arlyn Phoenix
- Relatives: Rain Phoenix (sister); Joaquin Phoenix (brother); Liberty Phoenix (sister); Summer Phoenix (sister)
- Musical career
- Genres: Alternative rock; folk rock; garage rock; indie rock; jangle pop
- Instruments: Vocals; guitar
- Formerly of: Aleka's Attic

River Jude Phoenix (né Bottom; August 23, 1970 – October 31, 1993) was an American actor and musician. The older brother of actor Joaquin Phoenix, he was known as a teen actor before taking on leading roles in critically acclaimed films, becoming one of the preeminent acting talents of his generation. Phoenix's numerous accolades include the Volpi Cup and the Independent Spirit Award, as well as nominations for an Academy Award and Golden Globe Award.

Phoenix grew up in an itinerant family as the older brother of Rain, Joaquin, Liberty and Summer Phoenix. He began his acting career at age 10 in television commercials. His early film roles include Explorers (1985), Stand by Me (1986) and The Mosquito Coast (1986). Phoenix then made a transition into adult-oriented roles, earning a nomination for the Academy Award for Best Supporting Actor for his role in the Sidney Lumet drama Running on Empty (1988). He earned the Volpi Cup for Best Actor and the Independent Spirit Award for Best Male Lead for his performance as Michael Waters, a gay hustler in search of his estranged mother, in the Gus Van Sant drama My Own Private Idaho (1991).

Phoenix died at age 23 in the early hours of October 31, 1993, from acute multiple drug intoxication including cocaine and opiates taken before arriving at or at the Viper Room in West Hollywood, California. At the time, he was filming Dark Blood. (Note: River would have subsequently begun filming for Interview with a Vampire)

== Early life ==
River Jude Phoenix was born on August 23, 1970, in Madras, Oregon, the first child of Arlyn Dunetz and John Lee Bottom. He had four younger siblings: Rain (born 1972), Joaquin (born 1974), Liberty (born 1976) and Summer (born 1978), as well as a paternal half-sister, Jodean (born 1964). Phoenix's parents named him after the river of life (Note: The exact phrase "river of life" doesn't occur in either the original (as Fluß des Lebens) or in the translation which was the only translation which existed at the time in English. The imaginary novel is different to the actual life of Siddhartha (S.), and is thought to be based on the personal spiritual struggle of Hesse. The river is used by the author as a route by which the protagonist appreciates eternity in a personal so religious context from repeat experience of nature. S.'s atman transassociates the river.) from the Hermann Hesse novel Siddhartha, and he received his middle name from the Beatles' song "Hey Jude". River's last name was changed to Phoenix after his eighth or ninth birthday. In a 1993 interview with People, Phoenix described his parents as "hippieish".

His mother, Arlyn, was born in New York to Jewish parents whose families were of Hungarian-Jewish and Russian-Jewish origins. His father, John Lee Bottom, was a lapsed Catholic from Fontana, California. In 1968, Phoenix's mother travelled across the United States. While hitchhiking in California, she met John Lee Bottom. They got married on September 13, 1969, less than a year after meeting.

Phoenix's family moved cross country when he was very young. Phoenix has stated that they lived in a "desperate situation". Phoenix often played guitar while he and his sister sang on street corners for money and food to support their ever-growing family. Phoenix never attended formal school. Screenwriter Naomi Foner later commented, "He was totally, totally without education. I mean, he could read and write, and he had an appetite for it, but he had no deep roots into any kind of sense of history or literature." Filmmaker George Sluizer claimed Phoenix was dyslexic.

=== South America: Children of God cult ===
From the age of three to seven Phoenix lived in Venezuela, Puerto Rico, and Mexico, where his parents were doing missionary work. In 1973, the family had joined the religious cult known as the Children of God and settled in Caracas, Venezuela, where the Children of God had stationed them to work as missionaries and fruit gatherers.

According to Vanity Fair, Phoenix was raped at the age of four. In an interview with Details magazine in November 1991, Phoenix stated he lost his virginity at age four to other children while in the Children of God, but he had "blocked it out". In 2019, his brother Joaquin would claim that River was joking, saying, "It was literally a joke, because he was so tired of being asked ridiculous questions by the press." Although Phoenix rarely talked about the cult, he was quoted in an article published in Esquire in 1994 as having said, "They're disgusting, they're ruining people's lives."

=== Return to the US ===
Arlyn and John eventually grew disillusioned with the "Church" and left the cult in 1977, and by the time Phoenix was nine years of age he was again living in the US, in Los Angeles.

== Acting career ==
=== 1980–1985: Early work and acting background ===
Back in the United States, Arlyn began working as a secretary for an NBC broadcaster and John as an exteriors architect. Talent agent Iris Burton spotted River, Joaquin, Summer and Rain singing for spare change in Westwood, Los Angeles, and was so charmed by the family that she soon represented the four siblings.

Phoenix started acting by auditioning when he was 10 years old and acted in commercials for Mitsubishi, Ocean Spray and Saks Fifth Avenue, soon afterward he and the other children were signed by Paramount Pictures casting director Penny Marshall. River and Rain (named Rainbow at that time) were assigned immediately to a show called Real Kids as audience warm-up performers. In 1982, Phoenix was cast in the short-lived CBS television series Seven Brides for Seven Brothers, in which he starred as youngest brother Guthrie McFadden.

Almost a year after Seven Brides ended in 1983, Phoenix found a new role in the 1984 television movie Celebrity, in which he played the part of young Jeffie Crawford. Less than a month after Celebrity came the ABC Afterschool Special: Backwards: The Riddle of Dyslexia. Phoenix starred as a young boy who discovers he has dyslexia. Joaquin starred in a small role alongside his brother. In September, the pilot episode of short-lived TV series It's Your Move aired. Phoenix was cast as Brian and had only one line of dialogue. He also starred as Robert Kennedy's son, Robert F. Kennedy Jr., in the TV movie Robert Kennedy and His Times. After his role in Dyslexia was critically acclaimed, Phoenix was almost immediately cast in a major role in made-for-TV movie Surviving: A Family in Crisis. He starred as Philip Brogan alongside Molly Ringwald and Heather O'Rourke. Halfway through the filming of Surviving, Iris Burton contacted him about a possible role in the film Explorers.

In October 1984, Phoenix secured the role of geeky boy-scientist Wolfgang Müller in Joe Dante's big-budget science-fiction film Explorers alongside Ethan Hawke, and production began soon after. Released in the summer of 1985, this was Phoenix's first major motion picture role. In October 1986, Phoenix co-starred alongside Tuesday Weld and Geraldine Fitzgerald in the acclaimed CBS television movie Circle of Violence: A Family Drama, which told a story of domestic elder abuse. This was Phoenix's last television role before achieving film stardom.

=== 1986–1993: Breakthrough and final projects ===
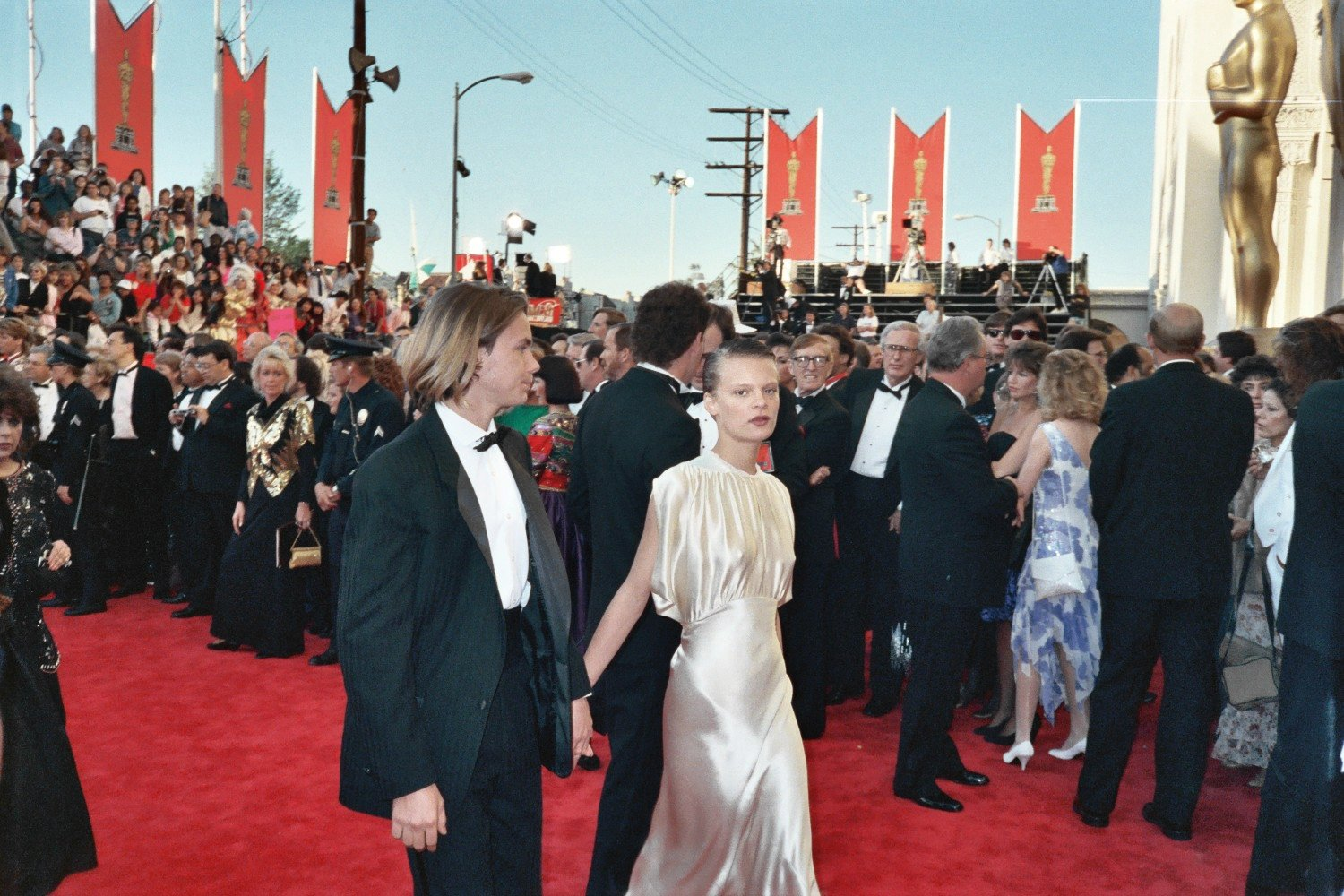
Phoenix and Martha Plimpton on the red carpet at the 61st Academy Awards in 1989

Phoenix had a significant role in Rob Reiner's popular coming-of-age film Stand by Me (1986), which made him a household name at 16. Filming started on June 17, 1985, and ended in late August 1985 (making Phoenix 14-years-old for most --if not all-- of the movie). The Washington Post opined that Phoenix gave the film its "centre of gravity". Phoenix commented: "The truth is, I identified so much with the role of Chris Chambers that if I hadn't had my family to go back to after the shoot, I'd have probably had to see a psychiatrist." Later that year, Phoenix completed Peter Weir's The Mosquito Coast (1986), playing the son of Harrison Ford and Helen Mirren's characters. "He was obviously going to be a movie star," observed Weir. "It's something apart from acting ability. Laurence Olivier never had what River had." During the five-month shoot in Belize, Phoenix began a romance with co-star Martha Plimpton, a relationship which continued in some form for many years. Phoenix was surprised by the poor reception for the film, feeling more secure about his work in it than he had in Stand by Me.

Phoenix was next cast as the lead in the teen comedy-drama A Night in the Life of Jimmy Reardon (1988), but was disappointed with his performance: "It didn't turn out the way I thought it would, and I put the blame on myself. I wanted to do a comedy, and it was definitely a stretch, but I'm not sure I was even the right person for the role." Also in 1988, Phoenix starred in Little Nikita alongside Sidney Poitier. During this time, the Phoenix family continued to move on a regular basis, relocating over forty times by the time Phoenix was 18. Phoenix purchased his family a ranch in Micanopy, Florida, near Gainesville, in 1987, in addition to a spread in Costa Rica.

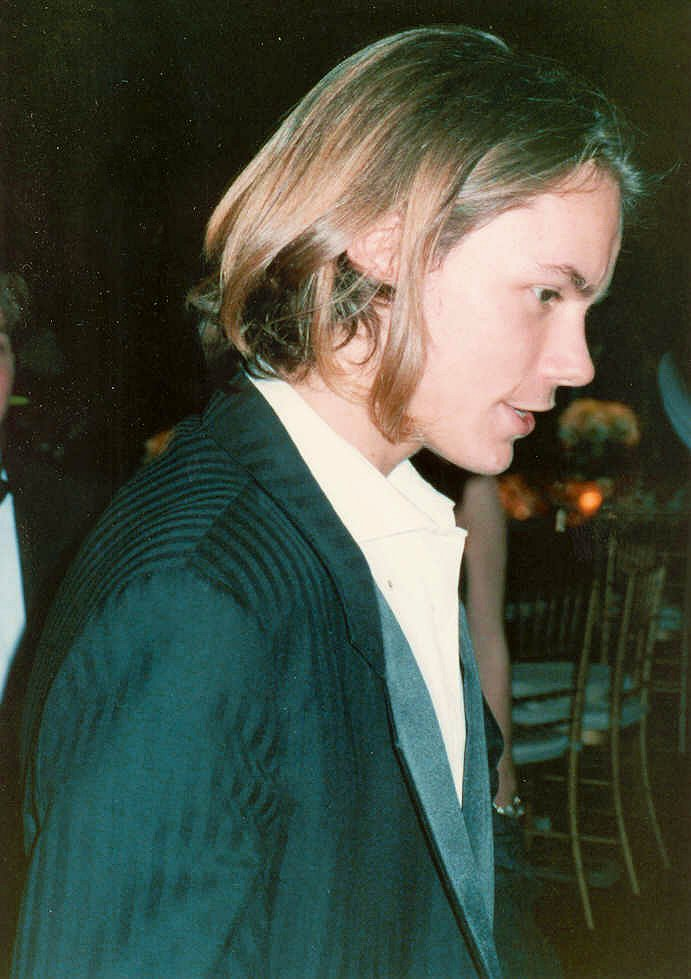
Phoenix at the 61st Academy Awards' Governor's Ball, March 1989, aged 18

His sixth feature film was Sidney Lumet's Running on Empty (1988), for which the 18-year-old Phoenix received National Board of Review Award for Best Supporting Actor and nominations for a Golden Globe Award and an Academy Award, becoming the sixth-youngest Academy Award nominee in the category. Phoenix jumped to his feet during the ceremony when Kevin Kline beat him for the Oscar. "I had to stop River from running to hug Kevin," recalled his mother Arlyn. "It never crossed his mind that he hadn't won". In 1989, he portrayed a young Indiana Jones in the prologue of the box-office hit Indiana Jones and the Last Crusade, the third installment of the Indiana Jones franchise, directed by Steven Spielberg and starring Harrison Ford.

Phoenix was photographed by Bruce Weber for Vogue and was spokesperson for a campaign for Gap in 1990. He starred with Kevin Kline, Tracey Ullman, Joan Plowright and Keanu Reeves in the 1990 comedy film I Love You to Death. Phoenix had met Reeves while Reeves was filming the 1989 film Parenthood with Phoenix's brother, Joaquin, and girlfriend, Martha Plimpton; however, Phoenix had reportedly auditioned for the character "Bill" in Reeves's then-current film Bill & Ted's Excellent Adventure before the role was taken by Alex Winter.

He co-starred with Lili Taylor in the acclaimed independent picture Dogfight (1991), directed by Nancy Savoca. In the romantic coming-of-age drama set in San Francisco, Phoenix portrayed a young U.S. Marine on the night before he is shipped off to Vietnam in November 1963. Taylor remarked that Phoenix suffered because he could not distance himself from his character: "He also hadn't gotten into any [drugs]—he was just drinking then, too. It was different... That was actually a hard part for him, because it was so radically different from who he was. He was such a hippie, and here he was playing this marine. It actually caused him a lot of discomfort. I don't think he enjoyed that, actually, getting into that psyche."

Phoenix reunited with Keanu Reeves to co-star in Gus Van Sant's 1991 avant-garde film My Own Private Idaho. In his review for Newsweek, David Ansen praised Phoenix's performance as gay hustler Michael Waters: "The campfire scene in which Mike awkwardly declares his unrequited love for Scott is a marvel of delicacy. In this, and every scene, Phoenix immerses himself so deeply inside his character you almost forget you've seen him before: it's a stunningly sensitive performance, poignant and comic at once". He won the Volpi Cup for Best Actor at the 1991 Venice Film Festival. In addition, the 21-year-old Phoenix received Independent Spirit Award for Best Male Lead and National Society of Film Critics Award for Best Actor, becoming the second-youngest winner of the former. His critically acclaimed performance helped bring queer cinema to a mainstream audience. The film and its success solidified his image as an actor with edgy, leading man potential. In that period, Phoenix was beginning to use marijuana, cocaine and heroin with some friends.

Around this time, Phoenix was approached by George Lucas to reprise his role of a younger Indiana Jones for The Young Indiana Jones Chronicles, a spin-off television series produced by the ABC that served as a prequel to the Indiana Jones films. However, Phoenix declined to reprise the role due to having started his career in different sitcoms and struggled hard to get out from the television medium, not being willing to return to it. The role of a younger Indy was eventually filled by Corey Carrier and Sean Patrick Flannery, respectively.

He teamed up with Robert Redford and again with Sidney Poitier for the conspiracy/espionage thriller Sneakers (1992). A month later, he began production on Sam Shepard's art-house ghost western Silent Tongue (which was released in 1994). He was beaten out for the role of Paul by Brad Pitt in A River Runs Through It. Phoenix then starred in Peter Bogdanovich's country music-themed film, The Thing Called Love (1993), the last completed picture before his death. He began a relationship with co-star Samantha Mathis on the set.

=== Unreleased and unfilmed projects ===
Phoenix's sudden death prevented him from playing various roles:

- Phoenix was due to begin work on Neil Jordan's Interview with the Vampire (1994) two weeks after his death. He was to play the part of Daniel Molloy, the interviewer, which then went to Christian Slater, who donated his entire $250,000 salary to two of Phoenix's favorite charitable organizations: Earth Save and Earth Trust. The film has a dedication to Phoenix after the end credits.
- The Guardian suggested in 2003 "it was likely that Phoenix would have followed Interview with the Vampire by appearing as Susan Sarandon's son in Safe Passage (1994), a role that went to Sean Astin.
- Phoenix had signed onto the lead role in Broken Dreams, a screenplay written by John Boorman and Neil Jordan (to be directed by Boorman), and co-starring Winona Ryder. The film was put on hold due to Phoenix's death. In June 2012, it was announced that Caleb Landry Jones had been cast in the role.
- Gus Van Sant had persuaded Phoenix to agree to play the role of Cleve Jones in Milk when he was originally planning on making the movie in the early 1990s. The role was eventually played by Emile Hirsch in 2008.
- When Gus Van Sant was asked in Interview magazine, "You were going to do a movie with River about Andy Warhol, right?", he said, "Yeah. River kind of looked like Andy in his younger days. But that project never really went forward."
- In 1988, Phoenix was reportedly carrying around a copy of the memoir The Basketball Diaries (1978). He had heard a movie version was in the works and wanted to play the autobiographical role of Jim Carroll. The film was sent into hiatus on numerous occasions with Phoenix being cited as the main contender for the role each time. The Basketball Diaries (1995) was made with 19-year-old Leonardo DiCaprio in the lead.
- He had expressed interest in playing the 19th-century poet Arthur Rimbaud in Total Eclipse (1995) by Polish director Agnieszka Holland. Phoenix died before the movie was cast, with the role eventually going to Leonardo DiCaprio.
- Phoenix was James Cameron's original choice to play Jack Dawson in Titanic (1997), with the role ultimately going to Leonardo DiCaprio.
- Comic book writer Lee Marrs claimed in a 2023 interview with the IndyCast podcast that Lucasfilm Ltd. considered for a while to make a continuation to the Indiana Jones film series starring Phoenix as a younger Indy, being this the primary reason for which Dark Horse Comics hoped to keep running their Indiana Jones comic book line. Phoenix's death in 1993 put an end to this option and Dark Horse cancelled their line a few years later, stopping the development of any Indiana Jones films until Indiana Jones and the Kingdom of the Crystal Skull (2008). Last Crusade actor Richard Young previously claimed in 2018 that there were talks about him and Phoenix doing a prequel movie together about Phoenix's younger Indy and Young's Fedora.

== Music ==
Although Phoenix's movie career was generating most of the income for his family, it has been stated by close friends and relatives that his true passion was music. Phoenix was a singer, songwriter and accomplished guitarist. He had begun teaching himself guitar at age five and had stated in an interview for E! in 1988 that his family's move to Los Angeles when he was nine was so that he and his sister "could become recording artists. I fell into commercials for financial reasons and acting became an attractive concept". Before securing an acting agent, Phoenix and his siblings tried to forge a career in music by playing cover versions on the streets of the Westwood district of LA, often being moved along by police because gathering crowds would obstruct the sidewalk. From the first fruits of his film success, Phoenix saved $650 to obtain his prized possession: a guitar with which he wrote what he described as "progressive, ethereal folk-rock".

While working on A Night in the Life of Jimmy Reardon in 1986, Phoenix had written and recorded a song, "Heart to Get", specifically for the end credits of the movie. 20th Century Fox cut it from the completed film, but director William Richert put it back into place for his director's cut some years later. It was during filming that Phoenix met Chris Blackwell of Island Records; this meeting would later secure Phoenix a two-year development deal with the label. Phoenix disliked the idea of being a solo artist and relished collaboration; therefore he focused on putting together a band. Aleka's Attic were formed in 1987 and the lineup included his sister Rain.

Phoenix was committed to gaining credibility by his own merit and maintained that the band would not use his name when securing performances that were not benefits for charitable organizations. Phoenix's first release was "Across the Way", co-written with bandmate Josh McKay, which was released in 1989 on a benefit album for PETA titled Tame Yourself. In 1991, Phoenix wrote and recorded a spoken word piece called "Curi Curi" for Milton Nascimento's album TXAI. Also in 1991, the Aleka's Attic track "Too Many Colors" was used in the film My Own Private Idaho, which included Phoenix in a starring role.

Aleka's Attic disbanded in 1992, but Phoenix continued writing and performing. While working on the film The Thing Called Love in 1993, Phoenix wrote and recorded the song "Lone Star State of Mine", which he performs in the movie. The song was not included on the film's soundtrack album. In 1996, the Aleka's Attic track "Note to a Friend" was released on the 1996 benefit album In Defense of Animals; Volume II and featured Flea of Red Hot Chili Peppers on bass. Phoenix had collaborated with friend John Frusciante after his first departure from Red Hot Chili Peppers and the songs "Height Down" and "Well I've Been" were released on Frusciante's second solo album Smile from the Streets You Hold in 1997. Phoenix was an investor in the original House of Blues (founded by his good friend and Sneakers co-star Dan Aykroyd) in Cambridge, Massachusetts, which opened its doors to the public after serving a group of homeless people on Thanksgiving Day 1992.

== Personal life ==
In February 1986, during the filming of The Mosquito Coast, Phoenix, then 15, began a romance with his co-star Martha Plimpton. They had met a year earlier but initially disliked each other. They also co-starred in the 1988 film Running on Empty before the relationship ended in June 1989 due to Phoenix's drug use. The two maintained a close friendship until his death. Plimpton later stated, "When we split up, a lot of it was that I had learned that screaming, fighting and begging wasn't going to change him. He had to change himself, and he didn't want to yet."

Pink, a roman à clef by director Gus Van Sant, asserts that Phoenix was not a regular drug user but only an occasional one, and that the actor had a more serious problem with alcohol. Phoenix had always tried to hide his addictions because he feared that they might ruin his career as they did his relationship with Plimpton.

For the last year of his life, in 1993, he dated his The Thing Called Love co-star Samantha Mathis. Mathis was with Phoenix on the night he died.

=== Advocacy and beliefs ===
Phoenix was a dedicated animal rights and environmental activist. He was a vegan from the age of seven. He was a prominent spokesperson for PETA and won their Humanitarian Award in 1992 for his fund-raising efforts. His first girlfriend Martha Plimpton recalled: "Once when we were fifteen, River and I went out for a fancy dinner in Manhattan, and I ordered soft-shell crabs. He left the restaurant and walked around on Park Avenue, crying. I went out and he said, 'I love you so much, why? ... ' He had such pain that I was eating an animal, that he hadn't impressed on me what was right."

In 1990, Phoenix wrote an environmental awareness essay about Earth Day targeted at his young fan base, which was printed in Seventeen magazine. He financially aided many environmental and humanitarian organizations, and bought 800 acres (320 ha) of endangered rainforest in Costa Rica. As well as giving speeches at rallies for various groups, Phoenix and his band often played environmental benefits for well-known charities as well as local ones in the Gainesville, Florida, area.

He campaigned for Bill Clinton in the 1992 U.S. presidential election.

== Death ==
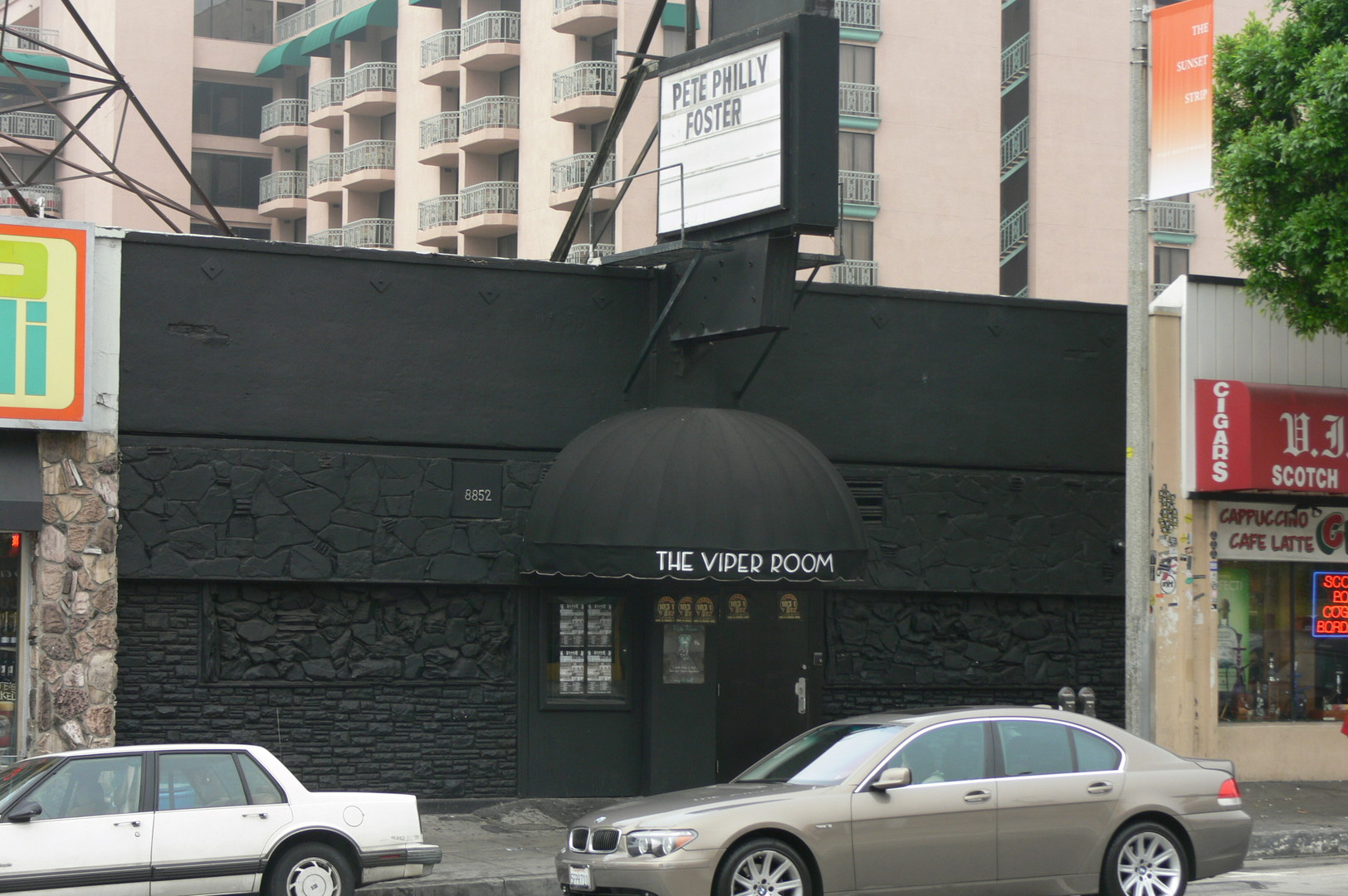
The Viper Room on Sunset Strip in Los Angeles, where Phoenix died

In late October 1993, Phoenix had returned to Los Angeles after flying back from spending one week in New Mexico. Before that, he had spent six to seven weeks in Utah to complete the three weeks of interior shots left on his last project, Dark Blood.

In Bob Forrest's book, Running with Monsters, he wrote that Phoenix spent the days preceding his death on a drug binge with John Frusciante from the Red Hot Chili Peppers. Phoenix and Frusciante were consuming cocaine and heroin and had not slept for several days.

On the evening of October 30, 1993, Phoenix arrived with his girlfriend Samantha Mathis, his brother Joaquin, and sister Rain at the Viper Room, a West Hollywood nightclub partly owned by Johnny Depp. Phoenix was to perform with the band P, which featured Phoenix's friends Flea and John Frusciante from the Red Hot Chili Peppers, Gibby Haynes of the Butthole Surfers, Al Jourgensen of Ministry, and Depp.

According to Bob Forrest, during the performance by P, Phoenix tapped Forrest on the shoulder to tell him he was not feeling well and that he thought he had overdosed. Forrest said to Phoenix that he did not think that he was overdosing because he could stand and talk. Nonetheless, Forrest offered to take him home, but Phoenix declined, saying he was feeling better. A few moments later, Forrest said that a commotion erupted in the club and he went outside to find Mathis screaming as River was lying on the sidewalk having convulsions. Unable to determine whether River was breathing, Joaquin called 911. Rain proceeded to give River mouth-to-mouth resuscitation.

According to Gibby Haynes, the band was performing their song "Michael Stipe" while Phoenix was outside the venue having seizures on the sidewalk. When the news filtered through the club, Flea left the stage and rushed outside. By that time, paramedics had arrived on the scene and found Phoenix in apparent cardiac arrest. Flea accompanied him to Cedars-Sinai Medical Center, but attempts to resuscitate Phoenix at the hospital were unsuccessful. He was pronounced dead at 1:51 a.m. PST on the morning of October 31, 1993, at the age of 23.

Years later, Samantha Mathis said that during her relationship with Phoenix, she had known him to be sober. However, Mathis added that in the moments just before his death, she "knew something was going on". She said, "I didn't see anyone doing drugs [that night] but he was high in a way that made me feel uncomfortable". She also said that "the heroin that killed him didn't happen until he was in the Viper Room." Mathis went to the restroom; on her way back to the table, she saw Phoenix scuffling with another man. The bouncers removed both men from the club. Mathis shouted at the other man, "What have you done? What are you on?" Another person responded, "Leave him alone, you're spoiling his high." By that time, Phoenix had fallen to the ground and begun to convulse.

=== Aftermath ===
After Phoenix's death, the club became a makeshift shrine with fans and mourners leaving flowers, pictures, and candles on the sidewalk and graffiti messages on the walls of the venue. A sign was placed in the window that read, "With much respect and love to River and his family, The Viper Room is temporarily closed. Our heartfelt condolences to all his family, friends and loved ones. He will be missed." The club remained closed for a week. Depp continued to close the club every year on October 31 until selling his share in 2004.

Forensic examination found cocaine and heroin (opiates), marijuana (cannabinoids), benzodiazepine and propoxyphene. The cause of death was "acute multiple drug intoxication". A spokesman for the coroner's office said the amount of cocaine and morphine found were both independently sufficient to have caused death.

On November 24, 1993, Arlyn Phoenix (who later changed her name to Heart) published an open letter in the Los Angeles Times on her son's life and death. It read, in part:

His friends, co-workers and the rest of our family know that River was not a regular drug user. He lived at home in Florida with us and was almost never a part of the "club scene" in Los Angeles. He had just arrived in L.A. from the pristine beauty and quietness of Utah where he was filming for six weeks. We feel that the excitement and energy of the Halloween nightclub and party scene were way beyond his usual experience and control. How many other beautiful young souls, who remain anonymous to us, have died by using drugs recreationally? It is my prayer that River's leaving in this way will focus the attention of the world on how painfully the spirits of his generation are being worn down. River made such a big impression during his life on Earth. He found his voice and found his place. And even River, who had the whole world at his fingertips to listen, felt deep frustration that no one heard. What is it going to take? Chernobyl wasn't enough. Exxon Valdez wasn't enough. A bloody war over oil wasn't enough. If River's passing opens our global heart, then I say, thanks dear, beloved son, for yet another gift to all of us.

Before his death, Phoenix's image—one he bemoaned in interviews—had been of a clean and attractive role model. Phoenix spoke often of his firm opposition to all forms of oppression and affirmatively espoused beliefs in compassion that reach across narrow boundaries including racial, national, and species. For example, the actor declined a lucrative advertising gig that would have required him to wear leather, which led his peers to endorse Phoenix's image as a courageous role model. Phoenix was widely regarded "as the model of good health, clean living, and professional dedication—a cleaned-up '90s James Dean. He was known as a vegan, or ultra-vegetarian, who would not eat meat or dairy products or wear leather." Comparisons were made regarding the sudden deaths of both actors.

== Filmography ==
=== Film ===
Year	Title	Role	Notes
1985	Explorers	Wolfgang Müller	
1986	Stand by Me	Chris Chambers	
1986	The Mosquito Coast	Charlie Fox	
1988	A Night in the Life of Jimmy Reardon	Jimmy Reardon	
1988	Little Nikita	Jeff Grant	
1988	Running on Empty	Danny Pope	
1989	Indiana Jones and the Last Crusade	Young Indiana Jones	
1990	I Love You to Death	Devo Nod	
1991	Dogfight	Eddie Birdlace	
1991	My Own Private Idaho	Michael "Mikey" Waters	
1992	Sneakers	Carl Arbogast	
1993	The Thing Called Love	James Wright	
1994	Silent Tongue	Talbot Roe	Posthumous release
2012	Dark Blood	Boy	Posthumous release, final film role – filmed in 1993

=== Television ===
Year	Title	Role	Notes
1982–1983	Seven Brides for Seven Brothers	Guthrie McFadden	21 episodes
1984	Celebrity	Jeffie Crawford (Age 11)	Miniseries
1984	ABC Afterschool Special	Brian Ellsworth	Episode: "Backwards: The Riddle of Dyslexia"
1984	It's Your Move	Brian	Episode: "Pilot"
1984	Hotel	Kevin	Episode: "Transitions"
1985	Robert Kennedy and His Times	Robert Kennedy Jr. (Part 3)	Miniseries
1985	Family Ties	Eugene Forbes	Episode: "My Tutor"
1985	Surviving: A Family in Crisis	Philip Brogan	Television film
1986	Circle of Violence: A Family Drama	Chris Benfield	Television film

=== Music videos ===
Year	Title	Artist	Role
1986	"Stand by Me"	Ben E. King	Himself
1992	"Breaking the Girl"	Red Hot Chili Peppers	Himself

== Legacy and recognition ==
Phoenix is often regarded as one of the most talented actors of his generation. (Note: Attributed to multiple sources.) Actors who have credited him as a major influence as well as paving the way for them include Leonardo DiCaprio, Jared Leto and James Franco. As teenagers, Matt Damon and Ben Affleck used "RiverP," in homage to Phoenix, as the password to the bank account they shared. During his acceptance speech for Best Actor at the 92nd Academy Awards, Joaquin Phoenix honored his brother by stating "When he was 17, my brother [River] wrote this lyric. He said: 'run to the rescue with love and peace will follow.'" Joaquin and partner Rooney Mara named their son, River, after him.

Phoenix has been ranked on a number of lists recognizing his talent and career. He was listed as one of twelve "Promising New Actors of 1986" in "John Willis' Screen World" (2004). Phoenix was voted at No. 64 on a "Greatest Movie Stars of All Time" poll by Channel 4 television in the UK. The poll was made up wholly of votes from prominent figures of the acting and directing communities. He was ranked No. 86 in Empire magazine's "The Top 100 Movie Stars of All Time" list in 1997.

=== Awards and nominations ===
Year	Award	Category	Nominated work	Result	Ref.
1983	Young Artist Awards	Best Young Actor in a New Television Series	Seven Brides for Seven Brothers	Nominated	
1984	Young Artist Awards	Best Young Actor in a Drama Series	Seven Brides for Seven Brothers	Won	
1985	Young Artist Awards	Best Young Actor in a Family Film Made for Television	ABC Afterschool Special	Nominated	
1985	Young Artist Awards	Exceptional Performance by a Young Actor – Motion Picture	Explorers	Nominated	
1986	Young Artist Awards	Best Young Actor Starring in a Television Special or Mini-Series	Surviving: A Family in Crisis	Won	
1987	Young Artist Awards	Jackie Coogan Award (shared with Wil Wheaton, Corey Feldman and Jerry O'Connell)	Stand by Me	Won	
1988	Young Artist Awards	Best Young Male Superstar in Motion Pictures	The Mosquito Coast	Nominated	
1988	Academy Award	Best Supporting Actor	Running on Empty	Nominated	
1988	Golden Globe Award	Best Supporting Actor – Motion Picture	Running on Empty	Nominated	
1988	National Board of Review	Best Supporting Actor	Running on Empty	Won	
1991	Venice International Film Festival	Volpi Cup for Best Actor	My Own Private Idaho	Won	
1991	Independent Spirit Award	Best Male Lead	My Own Private Idaho	Won	
1991	National Society of Film Critics	Best Actor	My Own Private Idaho	Won	
1991	New York Film Critics Circle Award	Best Actor	My Own Private Idaho	2nd place	

=== In popular culture ===
Phoenix's status as a teen idol and promising young actor, and his subsequent premature death, made him a frequent subject in popular culture media. He first gained references in music with Brazilian singer Milton Nascimento writing the song "River Phoenix: Letter to a Young Actor" about him after having seen Phoenix in The Mosquito Coast (1986). The song appears on the 1989 release Miltons.

Gus Van Sant, with whom Phoenix worked in the film My Own Private Idaho, dedicated his 1993 movie Even Cowgirls Get the Blues as well as his 1997 novel Pink to him. Experimental Santa Cruz filmmaker Cam Archer also produced a documentary called Drowning River Phoenix as part of his American Fame series.

Natalie Merchant, singer from 10,000 Maniacs, wrote and sang about the media's immediate and critical effect on culture and cultural icons such as River Phoenix. In "River", a 1995 song from Tigerlily, Merchant defends River Phoenix as she castigates the media for systematically dissecting the child actor after his death.

Phoenix was the subject of a controversial song by Australian group TISM titled "(He'll Never Be An) Ol' Man River". The single originally featured a mock-up of Phoenix's tombstone as its cover art in 1995. The chorus features the line, "I'm on the drug that killed River Phoenix."

A lesser-known reference to River Phoenix was Final Fantasy VIII's main protagonist Squall Leonhart. Tetsuya Nomura, the lead character designer for the game, stated he modeled Squall on Phoenix's visage during development and even gave Squall the same birthdate. The scene of Phoenix's death also merits several mentions in William Gibson's book Spook Country.

== See also ==
- List of oldest and youngest Academy Award winners and nominees – Youngest nominees for Best Actor in a Supporting Role
- List of actors with Academy Award nominations
- List of Jewish Academy Award winners and nominees
- List of siblings with Academy Award acting nominations
- List of animal rights advocates
- List of vegans
