= Esther Kahn =

- Directed by: Arnaud Desplechin
- Written by: Arnaud Desplechin; Emmanuel Bourdieu; Arthur Symons, story
- Produced by: Alain Sarde
- Starring: Summer Phoenix; Ian Holm; Fabrice Desplechin; László Szabó; Frances Barber
- Narrated by: Ramin Gray
- Cinematography: Eric Gautier
- Edited by: Hervé de Luze; Martine Giordano
- Music by: Howard Shore
- Production companies: Why Not Productions; Les Films Alain Sarde; France 3 Cinéma; France 2 Cinéma; Zephyr Films
- Distributed by: BAC Films (France); Feature Film Company (United Kingdom)
- Release dates: 18 May 2000 (Cannes); 1 March 2002 (U.S.)
- Running time: 142 minutes
- Countries: France; United Kingdom
- Language: English

Esther Kahn is the first English-language film by the French director Arnaud Desplechin. It premiered at the 2000 Cannes Film Festival where it competed for the Palme d'Or, but was not distributed to the United States for two years until it played in New York City in 2002. It stars Summer Phoenix as Esther and Ian Holm as her friend and teacher, Nathan Quellen.

== Synopsis ==
Esther Kahn lives in London's East End at the end of the 19th century. She works as a seamstress with her Jewish family, but finds no satisfaction in it. Withdrawn and the target of her siblings' mockery, she remains uncertain about her future. One day, after attending a play, she decides to become an actress. Starting with background roles, minor parts, and understudy work, she gradually becomes self-sufficient. Under the mentorship of Nathan Quellen, a washed-up actor, she hones her skills—but still lacks real-life experience.

== Cast ==
- Summer Phoenix as Esther Kahn
- Ian Holm as Nathan Quellen
- Fabrice Desplechin as Philippe Haygard
- Akbar Kurtha as Samuel Kahn
- Frances Barber as Rivka Kahn
- László Szabó as Ytzhok Kahn
- Hilary Sesta as Buba
- Claudia Solti as Mina Kahn
- Berna Raif as Becky Kahn
- Emmanuelle Devos as Sylvia (the Italian woman)
- Paul Regan as Joel
- Arnold Brown as Rabbi
- Leon Lissek as Theatre manager
- Ian Bartholomew as Norton
- Samantha Lavelle as Christel
- Kika Markham as Trish
- Paul Ritter as Alman, the photographer

== Production ==
Deplechin adapted the screenplay with regular collaborator Emmanuel Bourdieu from a short story by Arthur Symons of the same name from his book Spiritual Adventures. Summer Phoenix auditioned three times before she was offered the role of Esther.

== Reception ==
Initial reviews of the film were mixed. On the review aggregator website Rotten Tomatoes, the film has an approval rating of 54%, based on 26 reviews. On Metacritic, the film has a weighted average score of 46 out of 100, based on 12 critics.

Cahiers du cinéma named it the best film of 2000. In 2010 it ranked 52nd on Film Comment's end of the decade critics poll.
