= Summer Phoenix =

American actress (born 1978)

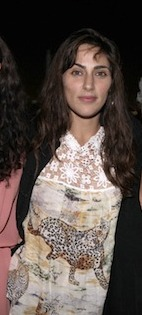
- Phoenix in 2011
- Born: Summer Joy Bottom; December 10, 1978 (age 47)
- Occupations: Actress; musician
- Years active: 1984–2004; 2016–present
- Known for: The Believer; Swamp Thing; The Faculty; Esther Kahn; SLC Punk!
- Spouse: Casey Affleck (m. 2006; div. 2017)
- Children: 2
- Mother: Arlyn Phoenix
- Relatives: River Phoenix (brother); Rain Phoenix (sister); Joaquin Phoenix (brother); Liberty Phoenix (sister)

Summer Phoenix (born Summer Joy Bottom, December 10, 1978) is an American actress and musician. She is the youngest sibling of actors River, Rain, Joaquin, and Liberty Phoenix.

== Early life ==
Phoenix's mother, Arlyn Sharon (née Dunetz), was born in New York, to Jewish parents of Hungarian-Jewish and Russian-Jewish descent. Her father, John Lee Bottom, was from California and has English, German, and French ancestry.

== Career ==
Phoenix was a child actor, working with agent Iris Burton along with her brothers and sister at the age of two, and went on to have guest roles in Murder, She Wrote, Growing Pains (as a not-very-close friend of Ben Seaver), Swamp Thing, and Airwolf. She appeared in the TV movie Kate's Secret and in Russkies, playing the younger sister of real-life brother Joaquin. Phoenix later appeared in Wasted, The Laramie Project, SLC Punk!, Dinner Rush, The Believer, and The Faculty. She played leads in Esther Kahn (2000) and Suzie Gold (2004).

In 2002, Phoenix starred in a three-month run of This is Our Youth at the Garrick Theatre alongside Matt Damon and Casey Affleck.

She was a member of the rock band The Causey Way with her sister Rain. She later made guest appearances on albums by Rain's band, the Papercranes.

== Personal life ==
She became engaged to Casey Affleck on December 25, 2003, and gave birth to a son in Amsterdam. Phoenix and Affleck married on June 3, 2006, in Savannah, Georgia, and had a second son. In March 2016, Affleck and Phoenix publicly announced they were separating, though it has been acknowledged that they separated in November 2015. Phoenix filed a petition of divorce with the Superior Court of California in Los Angeles on August 1, 2017, citing "irreconcilable differences," and it was finalized three days later.

In 2003, she and friends Odessa Whitmire and Ruby Canner opened the vintage clothing boutique Some Odd Rubies on Manhattan's Lower East Side. It closed in 2012.

Phoenix is vegan.

== Filmography ==
Film
Year	Title	Role	Notes
1987	Russkies	Candi	
1997	Arresting Gena	Jane Freeman	
1998	I Woke Up Early The Day I Died	Bartender#2 / Girl at the Beach	
1998	Girl	Rebecca Fernhurst	
1998	Can't Hardly Wait	Candy	Scenes deleted
1998	SLC Punk!	Brandy	
1998	The Faculty	F'%# You Girl	
2000	Committed	Meg	
2000	Esther Kahn	Esther Kahn	
2000	Dinner Rush	Marti Wellington	
2001	The Believer	Carla Moebius	
2002	The Laramie Project	Jen Malmskog	
2004	Suzie Gold	Suzie Gold	
2016	Two for One	Samantha	
2017	Across My Land		Short film
2017	The Mad Whale	Beatrice Price	
2017	The First	Vesta Tilley	
2018	Tiny Little Life		Short film
2019	Skin	Lucy	Short film
2022	What Comes Around	Beth	
TBA	Mary Pickford: Love Wild	Vesta Tilley	Post-production

Television
Year	Title	Role	Notes
1984	Airwolf	Little Girl	Season 2 episode 9: "Flight #093 Is Missing"
1984	Murder, She Wrote	Cindy Donovan	Season 1 episode 7: "We're Off to Kill the Wizard"
1986	Taking It Home	Frannie	TV movie
1986	Kate's Secret	Becky Stark	TV movie
1987	Growing Pains	Jody	Season 3 episode 6: "Big Brother's Not Watching"
1988	ABC Weekend Special	Lana	Season 11 episode 3: "Runaway Ralph"
1989	The New Leave It to Beaver	Bettie Haskell	Season 4 episode 14: "Still the New Leave It to Beaver"
1990	Swamp Thing	Lilly	Season 1 episode 10: "New Acquaintance"
1997	ER	Petra	Season 4 episode 1: "Ambush"
2002	Wasted	Samantha	TV movie
