= Daf Hobson =

British cinematographer

- Occupation: Cinematographer
- Website: dafhobson.com

Daf Hobson (born Dafydd Llewelyn Hobson) is a British cinematographer.

== Filmography ==
=== Cinematographer ===
- 2008 Fallout (TV)
- 2007 The Murder of Princess Diana (USA TV)
- 2007 The Bad Mother's Handbook (TV)
- 2006 The Street (TV)
- 2005 The English Harem (TV)
- 2005 Messiah: The Harrowing (TV)
- 2005 Cherished (TV)
- 2004 Early Doors (TV)
- 2004 Trial & Retribution VIII (TV)
- 2004 Suzie Gold (35mm Feature Film 2004)
- 2002 Dr. Jekyll and Mr. Hyde (35mm TV)
- 2001 Othello (TV) - Winner BAFTA, Lighting & Photography and Royal TV Society, Lighting & Photography
- 2001 Swallow (TV)
- 2001 Sword of Honour (TV)
- 2000 The Secret World of Michael Fry (TV)
- 1999 Eureka Street (TV) - Winner IAFTA, Lighting & Photography
- 1999 Births, Marriages and Deaths (TV)
- 1998 Bramwell: Loose Women (TV)
- 1997 The Lakes (TV) - Nominated BAFTA, Lighting and Photography
- 1997 Welcome to Sarajevo (35mm Feature Film 1996)
- 1996 The Tenant of Wildfell Hall (TV) - Winner Royal TV Society, Camera
- 1996 The Vanishing Man (TV)
- 1996 Guardians
- 1995 Go Now
- 1995 Bramwell Series One (TV) - Winner Royal TV Society, Lighting and Photography
- 1994 Family (TV) - Winner BAFTA, Lighting and Photography
