= I Woke Up Early the Day I Died =

1998 camp black comedy film written by Ed Wood

- Theatrical film poster
- Directed by: Aris Iliopulos
- Written by: Ed Wood
- Produced by: Chris Hanley; Billy Zane
- Starring: Billy Zane; Ron Perlman; Tippi Hedren; Andrew McCarthy; Will Patton; Nicollette Sheridan
- Cinematography: Michael F. Barrow
- Edited by: Dody Dorn
- Music by: Larry Groupé
- Distributed by: Cinequanon Pictures International, Inc.
- Release dates: September 13, 1998 (TIFF); September 10, 1999 (New York)
- Running time: 87 minutes
- Country: United States
- Language: English

I Woke Up Early the Day I Died is a 1998 American independent camp black comedy film, based on an unproduced screenplay written by Edward D. Wood Jr. in 1974. Wood originally wrote the script in 1961 as Silent Night, then rewrote it in 1974 as I Awoke Early the Day I Died, but he died before he could get it filmed.

The 1998 film, directed by Aris Iliopulos, stars Billy Zane, Tippi Hedren, Ron Perlman, Sandra Bernhard, Karen Black, Eartha Kitt, Summer Phoenix, and Christina Ricci, among many others who appear in cameos. The film has no dialogue, containing only atmospheric sounds, alternating bursts of laughter, and screams. Several of Wood's collaborators from the 1950s were featured in bit parts, including Maila Nurmi, Conrad Brooks, David Ward, and Wood's widow Kathy O'Hara Wood.

In the film, a fleeing thief and murderer accidentally attend a strange funeral at a forbidden cemetery. He tries to hide his loot within the coffin, but falls unconscious and loses track of the stolen cash. He awakes determined to locate everyone present at the funeral, in hopes that he can retrieve the cash.

== Plot ==
Overpowering a nurse and dressing in her clothes, a madman escapes from the Casa de la Loco Sanitarium. The Thief then goes on a crime spree that nets him a gun, a car, a fortune in stolen cash, and one dead loan office manager.

As he escapes the murder scene, he comes upon a forbidden cemetery just as burial is taking place, replete with bagpipe music and a bizarre ceremony employing tuning forks and strange icons. As the undertaker, the caretaker, and an odd assortment of mourners leave the service, The Thief peers into the coffin, thinking it is a good place to hide his briefcase full of ill-gotten gains.

As he strikes the tuning fork that is buried with the robe-draped skeleton, bagpipe music fills the air and throws him into convulsions. The coffin lid slams shut, locking his money inside, and The Thief is thrown into an open grave, knocking himself unconscious. When he awakens, he sets off to track down everyone who had been present at the funeral in an attempt to find his missing cash, killing anyone who gets in his way.

== Cast ==
- Billy Zane as The Thief
- Ron Perlman as Cemetery Caretaker
- Tippi Hedren as Maylinda Austed / Professional Mourner
- Andrew McCarthy as Cop
- Will Patton as Preacher
- Carel Struycken as Undertaker
- Max Perlich as Assistant Undertaker
- John Ritter as Robert Forrest / Professional Mourner
- Karen Black as Honey Child
- Sandra Bernhard as Sandy Sands / Professional Mourner and Stripper
- Eartha Kitt as Cult Leader
- Ann Magnuson as Loan Secretary
- Abraham Benrubi as Bouncer
- Christina Ricci as Teenage Hooker
- Jonathan Taylor Thomas as Boy At Beach
- Michael Greene as Tom Harris, Professional Mourner / Barfly
- Roberta Hanley as Housewife
- Rain Phoenix as Bartender #1
- Summer Phoenix as Bartender #2 / Girl At The Beach
- Tara Reid as Prom Queen / Nightclub Bartender
- David Ward as Cruiser Cop #1
- Rick Schroder as Cruiser Cop #2
- Nicollette Sheridan as Ballroom Woman
- Gregory Sporleder as Loan Manager
- Steven Weber as Policeman In Alley
- Kathleen O'Hara Wood as Woman At Carnival
- Billie Worley as Fat Taxi Driver
- Lee Arenberg as Parking Lot Attendant
- Mark Boone Junior as Cop #3
- Conrad Brooks as Cruise Cop #3
- Leif Garret as Cruiser Cop #4
- Dana Gould as Carnival Barker
- Michael G. Hagerty as Flop House Manager
- Denice D. Lewis as Star Stripper
- Maila Nurmi as Woman In Hotel Lobby
- Bud Cort as Shopkeeper Lord Heinrich "Binky" Alcoa III (uncredited)

== Production ==
Shortly after the release of the Tim Burton biopic Ed Wood in 1994, a renewed interest in Wood's work led to the script for I Woke Up Early the Day I Died getting optioned by first-time filmmaker Aris Iliopulos. Iliopulos got actor Billy Zane interested in the project. Zane agreed to star in and co-produce the film. During filming, the filmmakers used many techniques that Wood himself would use, such as including stock footage to save on filming expenses.

== Release ==
The film premiered at the 1998 Toronto International Film Festival, but attracted no interest from potential distributors. In September 1999, the film received one screening in New York at the now-defunct Screening Room. Within a week, the film's distributor, Cinequanon Pictures International, Inc., folded due to financial issues, and the film never had a wider American theatrical release. The film was also shown at the 2000 B-Movie Film Festival, where it won several awards. The company's legal problems have precluded commercial American home video and DVD release.

== Reception ==
The film received negative reactions by fans and critics alike, achieving a 27% approval rating on Rotten Tomatoes based on 11 reviews. Many criticized Iliopulos's failure to recreate Wood's innocent ineptitude at filmmaking, including Owen Gleiberman of Entertainment Weekly, who said the movie "never truly finds a way to evoke [Wood's] fractured hard-boiled syntax, his inimitable idiocy". Film critic Phil Hall commented that the film's mistake was to play up its camp factor instead of taking Wood's straightforward approach. He said this approach "missed the point of the charm that Wood’s films possessed: they were so serious and sincere that in their incompetence they gained a belated charm, pleasing those who love so-bad-they’re-good flicks. Whereas Wood cast bad actors who tried (and failed) to give good performances, Iliopulous cast credible actors and instructed them to give intentionally bad performances. Thus everyone is in ham heaven, with the entire cast rolling their eyes, sneering their lips, doing wild double takes and gasping as if they’ve been stuck in the posterior with a safety pin."

== Music ==
The instrumental soundtrack for the film was composed by Larry Groupé and recorded and mixed by John Kurlander.

=== Instrumental soundtrack listing ===
1. "Escape!" – 2:05
2. "My Kingdom For A Hot Dog" – 2:15
3. "My Ears Hurt" – 1:20
4. "Parking Booth Fight" – 0:54
5. "The Bank Job Tango" – 3:30
6. "Scaffold Dream" – 2:40
7. "Cult Waltz & Processional" – 3:57
8. "Caretaker's Lament" – 1:51
9. "Cemetery Knight" – 1:42
10. "Coppers" – 1:21
11. "Journey Continues" – 0:45
12. "Where's The Money?" – 0:58
13. "Caretaker's Death" – 1:18
14. "Mausoleum" – 1:30
15. "The Coffin Has No Money" – 2:23
16. "Shack Attack" – 2:16
17. "Purse Snatch" – 1:29
18. "Desperation" – 2:03
19. "Head Over Heels" – 1:20
20. "Torment And Woe" – 1:59
21. "Journey Smoke" – 1:03
22. "Long Ride Home" – 1:00
23. "Bagpipes Of Death" – 3:36

=== Additional music ===
There is additional music featured in the film that was not composed by Groupé. These songs were never released in compilation as a soundtrack to the film. The songs include "Jesus I Was Evil" by Darcy Clay, "Puttin' and Takin'" by The Ink Spots, "Bink e Bink" by Lisa Zane, "Anywhere I Hang My Heart" by Eartha Kitt, "Nature Boy" by Nat King Cole, and "Temper" by Goldie.

== See also ==
- Ed Wood filmography

== Sources ==
- The Haunted World of Edward D. Wood, Jr. (1996), documentary film directed by Brett Thompson
- Grey, Rudolph (1994). Nightmare of Ecstasy: The Life and Art of Edward D. Wood, Jr. Feral House. ISBN 978-0-922915-24-8.
