= Suzie Gold =

- Directed by: Richard Cantor
- Written by: Ric Cantor; Carry Franklin; Rebecca Green; Lisa Ratner
- Produced by: Steve Christian; Matthew T. Gannon; Rebecca Green; François Ivernel; Cameron McCracken; Duncan Reid; Paul Ritchie
- Starring: Summer Phoenix; Leo Gregory; Daniel Mendoza; Rachel Stevens; Ariana Fraval; Iddo Goldberg; Stanley Townsend; Rebecca Front; Gem Souleyman
- Cinematography: Daf Hobson
- Edited by: Michael Ellis
- Music by: Chris Elliott
- Distributed by: Pathé
- Release date: 5 March 2004 (UK)
- Running time: 94 minutes
- Country: United Kingdom
- Language: English
- Box office: $120,312

Suzie Gold is a 2004 British dramedy film directed by Richard Cantor and starring American actress Summer Phoenix. It is Cantor's directorial debut. It was released by Pathé on 5 March 2004 in the United Kingdom.

== Plot ==
The film stars Summer Phoenix as the title character, in the role of a young Jewish woman living in London with a sister who is about to marry a young Jewish man. Breaking with her secularized yet traditionally-inclined family, Suzie falls in love with the non-Jewish Darren (Leo Gregory). She fears introducing him to her family because of their opposition to intermarriage.

== Cast ==
- Summer Phoenix as Suzie Gold
- Leo Gregory as Darren
- Daniel Mendoza as Richard Levine
- Rachel Stevens as Tina
- Iddo Goldberg as Anthony Silver
- Ariana Fraval as Sophie Gold
- Stanley Townsend as Irving Gold
- Rebecca Front as Barbara Gold
- Gem Souleyman as Toby Gold
- Sophie Winkleman as Debby Levine
- Roger Kitter as Tony "Tiny" Levine
- Kevin Bishop as Ashley Marks
- Fiz Marcus as Hope Levine
- Dave Cohen as Grabber at Wedding
- Steve Jameson as Leo Spencer
- Frances Barber as Joyce Spencer
- Harriet Thorpe as Charity Silver
- Michelle Chadwick as Non-Jewish Wife
- Daniel Rabin as Jewish Husband

== Reception ==
The BBC rated the film 3 out of 5 stars. The reviewer compared it to My Big Fat Greek Wedding and noted the influence of Woody Allen in the humour. Time Out praised Phoenix's "versatility" yet felt the central romantic union of the film lacked "conviction". The magazine continued; "More amusement derives from the old stagers of the Jewish community (including Townsend, Front and Barber) and their attitudes to sex, marriage and culture, their gossipy antics spawning some neat one liners and farcical set pieces."Total Film gave the film 3 out of 5 stars, praising Phoenix' performance and the "acutely observed local detail".

== Soundtrack ==
The soundtrack, created by James Hyman, features an original song called "Want You More" by Sophie Ellis-Bextor.
