= Rain Phoenix =

American actress and musician

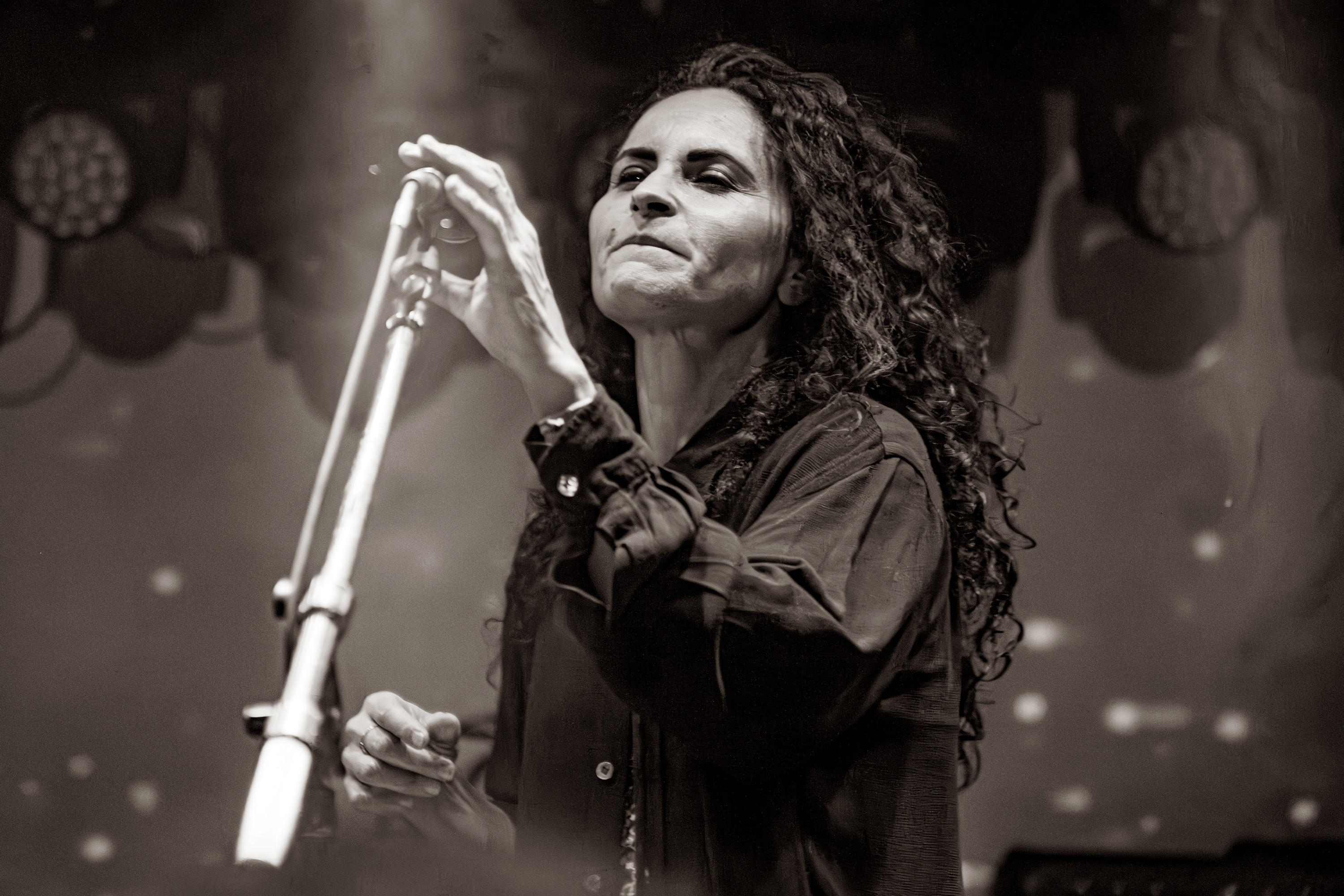
- Performing with Escape Artist Lovers
- Born: Rain Joan of Arc Bottom; November 21, 1972 (age 53); Crockett, Texas, U.S.
- Occupations: Actress, musician
- Years active: 1991–present
- Parents: Arlyn Phoenix; John Lee Bottom
- Relatives: River Phoenix (brother); Joaquin Phoenix (brother); Liberty Phoenix (sister); Summer Phoenix (sister)

Rain Joan of Arc Phoenix (née Bottom; born November 21, 1972) is an American actress, musician, and singer. She is the older sister of Joaquin, Liberty and Summer Phoenix and younger sister of River Phoenix.

== Early life ==
Phoenix was born Rain Joan of Arc Bottom in Crockett, Texas, the second child of John Lee Bottom and Arlyn Sharon (née Dunetz). Her mother was born in New York to Jewish parents of Hungarian-Jewish and Russian-Jewish origins. Her father was from California, and was of mixed European heritage. Before Phoenix was born, her mother moved to California, meeting Phoenix's father while hitch-hiking. They married in 1969 and joined The Children of God cult working as missionaries in South America. It was there, at the age of three, that Phoenix (accompanied by elder brother River on guitar) first began to sing. They would perform on the streets of Caracas, Venezuela, while handing out Children of God flyers to passers by. The family set out for California in order for the children to enter the entertainment industry. In West Los Angeles, Phoenix and her siblings would perform on the streets for crowds of people. Arlyn took a job at NBC and eventually secured all five Phoenix children with an agent.

Phoenix sang with brother River as an audience warm up act on the show Real Kids (1982). Various bit parts followed in TV shows, including an episode of Amazing Stories in 1986 (billed sometimes as Rainbow Phoenix) and Family Ties in 1987. Also in 1987, Phoenix landed a part in the feature film Maid to Order alongside Ally Sheedy.

At 15, Phoenix returned to her roots in music and formed the band Aleka's Attic with her then 17-year-old brother River. River, along with bass player Josh McKay, wrote music and lyrics while Rain sang backup. The band secured gigs in and around their home town of Gainesville, Florida. By this time, River's career had taken off and so the band was often put on hold for River's demanding schedule. In 1988, Aleka's Attic were signed to a development deal with Island Records and in 1989 released the track "Across The Way" on a benefit album for the animal rights group PETA. In 1991, they made a tour of east coast clubs and colleges. At this time, Phoenix joined her brother River on the set of his tenth movie, My Own Private Idaho. She met director Gus Van Sant, to whom River suggested she would be perfect for a role in his upcoming project, a film adaptation of Tom Robbins's cult novel Even Cowgirls Get the Blues. She was cast as head cowgirl Bonanza Jellybean, alongside Uma Thurman.

== River Phoenix's death ==
A few months after the completion of Even Cowgirls Get the Blues, Rain Phoenix flew to Los Angeles with her brother Joaquin to meet their brother River, during a break from Dark Blood. On the evening of October 30, 1993, they set out, joined by River's girlfriend Samantha Mathis, for a night at the West Hollywood club The Viper Room. It would be the last evening Rain would see her brother River; he died later that night from acute multiple drug intoxication.

Phoenix dealt simultaneously with the loss of her older brother and the media attention that followed. Aleka's Attic, by that time consisting of a different line-up, had been working on an album that River had been funding himself. The album was near completion so Phoenix began the long process of mixing and producing the scraps of recordings. The album was never released.

== Late 1990s and 2000s ==
In 1994, Phoenix joined R.E.M. in the studio to record backup vocals on the song "Bang and Blame", to be released on the 1994 album Monster, an album dedicated to River. In 1995 Phoenix joined the Red Hot Chili Peppers as a backup singer on their One Hot Minute tour. Chili Peppers bassist Flea, who appeared in My Own Private Idaho, was close friends with River, and was there the night he died. The band wrote their song "Transcending" as a tribute to River. She also features in the video for R.E.M.'s "At My Most Beautiful."

In 1997, Phoenix joined the punk/new wave band The Causey Way, which also included her younger sisters Summer and Liberty. They disbanded in 2001 after the release of two albums and two EPs.

Phoenix returned to acting in 1998 with parts in I Woke Up Early the Day I Died (1998), O (2001), Harry and Max (2004) and Hitch (2005).

== Music ==
=== Papercranes ===
Phoenix formed the band Papercranes in 2003 as lead singer and lyricist. Their self-titled EP was released in 2004 and their first album, Vidalia, in 2006. In 2010, Papercranes signed with Manimal Vinyl and in 2011 they released their second album Let's Make Babies in the Woods. In 2012 came their third and final release – a concept record Three followed by a multi-platform artist residency entitled I.You.We.Three. Guest musicians include Phoenix's younger sisters Summer and Liberty, as well as actor Dermot Mulroney, Libby Lavella, Norm Block, Jenny O, Kirk Hellie and Flea of the Red Hot Chili Peppers, who also was a guest musician on tracks for Aleka's Attic in the '90s.

=== Venus and the Moon ===
In 2013, Phoenix along with Frally Hynes formed the galactic country band Venus and the Moon, which included Chris Stills. The band released a self-titled 7-inch double-A side vinyl in 2014 and, in 2015, a record titled Brother, Son, which wasrecorded on her late brother River's 4-track recorder, mixed by Dave Way, and produced by Phoenix.

=== Rain Phoenix ===
In February 2019, Time Gone marked Phoenix's first release as a solo artist, with the single "Time Is the Killer" featuring R.E.M.'s Michael Stipe. The vinyl also contained two previously unreleased tracks by Aleka's Attic, "Where I'd Gone" and "Scales & Fishnails". It was released on Kro Records in collaboration with Phoenix's own LaunchLeft imprint.

Her first solo record, titled River, was slated for release on Halloween 2019 via LaunchLeft. The first single "Immolate" was released on what would have been River's 49th birthday, August 23, 2019. The record boasts eight tracks and includes a new piano version of "Time is the Killer" featuring Michael Stipe as well as a song entitled "Lost in Motion" co-written by Kirk Hellie and Phoenix's late brother River. The record was produced by Kirk Hellie, mixed by Dave Way and mastered by Dave McNair.

== Social initiatives ==
Phoenix, together with her brother Joaquin Phoenix, is on the board of directors for the Lunchbox Fund, a non-profit organization that provides a daily meal to students of township schools in Soweto, South Africa. Phoenix also serves on the board of the River Phoenix Center for Peacebuilding, which was founded by her mother and stepfather. Phoenix also works closely with the artists charity the Art of Elysium.

=== Gift Horse Project ===
In 2010 Rain created the non-profit Gift Horse Project, which brought together well-known and emerging artists in the service of charity. In 2011, Gift Horse Project released a compilation record to benefit the Lunchbox Fund with artists such as Bright Eyes, Albert Hammond JR, Cobra Starship, Joseph Arthur, Jenny O, Jonathan Wilson, and many more.

=== LaunchLeft ===
LaunchLeft evolved out of Gift Horse Project, taking the ethos of "artists helping artists" to the for-profit sector. LaunchLeft has produced large events for various non-profit organizations, namely the Art of Elysium (Genesis 2014) and the Bernie Sanders Campaign ("Feel the Bern" the Red Hot Chili Peppers + "Berniechella" 2016).

LaunchLeft is now a podcast hosted by Rain and Summer Phoenix where "famed creatives launch the next wave of music rebels."

== Filmography ==
Year	Film	Role	Notes
1986	Amazing Stories	Doris	Episode: "The Doll"
1987	Family Ties	Ashley Berkhart	Episode: "Band on the Run"
1987	Maid to Order	Brie Starkey	
1993	Even Cowgirls Get the Blues	Bonanza Jellybean	
1995	To Die For	Tambourine player in band	Uncredited
1998	I Woke Up Early the Day I Died	Bartender #1	
1999	R.E.M.: At My Most Beautiful	Cellist	Video short
1999	$pent	Kimberly	
1999	Façade	Terra	
2001	The Sleepy Time Gal	WROD Receptionist	
2001	O	Emily	
2001	Stranger Inside	Kit	TV movie
2004	Harry + Max	Nikki	
2004	The Disappearance of Andy Waxman	Holly	Short
2005	Hitch	Kate	
2005	Kids in America	Singer	
2010	Three Thousand Six Hundred and Fifty Days	Cora	Short
2014	Low Down	Kitty	
2015	Always Worthy	Vicki	
2015	Forever	Julie	
2016	Water Colors	Ditsa	Short
2021	Violet	Rita	
2023	Fuzzy Head	The Whistler	

== Discography ==
- River (2019)
