= The Causey Way =

- Genres: Punk rock. new wave
- Years active: 1997–2001
- Labels: Fueled By Ramen & Alternative Tentacles
- Past members: Causey (Scott Stanton), The Button (Bill Bryson), Dr. St.Causey (Tracy Cox-Stanton), Boy Causey (Brian Teasley), The Truth (Ane Diaz), Rain Causey (Rain Phoenix), Summer Causey (Summer Phoenix), Red Causey, Tex Causey (Josh Barry), Causey 3:16 (Colin English)

The Causey Way was an American punk/new wave group formed in 1997.

== History ==
The underlying theme was that of a cult operating as a band (with T-shirts coyly stating "The Causey Way Is Not A Cult"). The live shows were energetic and in the style of revivalist evangelism. With releases on Fueled By Ramen and Alternative Tentacles. Several members have since regrouped and started Pilot Scott Tracy, also on Alternative Tentacles.

The Causey Way was the philosophy of Causey, the actual band was referred to as the ACE, (Aural Communications and Entertainment) and a division of the Causey Way as a whole. The ACE was the main entertainment at the Causey Compound which was where those that follow the Causey Way resided.

The Causey Way disbanded in 2001, claiming that Causey had been institutionalized and The Truth had converted to Scientology.

== Discography ==
- WWCD (Put it on a Cracker, 1998)
- With Loving And Open Arms (Alternative Tentacles, 1999)
- Testimony [EP] (Fueled by Ramen, 2000)
- Causey Vs. Everything (Alternative Tentacles, 2001)
