= Department of Peace =

Proposed department of the U.S. federal government

The Department of Peace is a proposed cabinet-level department of the executive branch of the federal government of the United States.

== History ==
The peace movement in the United States has a proposed legislative history that dates to the first years of the republic:

- 1793: Benjamin Rush, Founding Father (signer of the Declaration of Independence), wrote an essay titled "A plan of a Peace-Office for the United States". Rush called for equal footing with the Department of War and pointed out the effect of doing so for the welfare of the United States in promoting and preserving perpetual peace in the United States. First published in a 1793 almanac that Benjamin Banneker authored, the plan stated:

1. Let a Secretary of Peace be appointed to preside in this office; . . . let him be a genuine republican and a sincere Christian. . . .

2. Let a power be given to the Secretary to establish and maintain free schools in every city, village and township in the United States; . . . Let the youth of our country be instructed in reading, writing, and arithmetic, and in the doctrines of a religion of some kind; the Christian religion should be preferred to all others; for it belongs to this religion exclusively to teach us not only to cultivate peace with all men, but to forgive—nay more, to love our very enemies. . . .

3. Let every family be furnished at public expense, by the Secretary of this office, with an American edition of the Bible. . . .

4. Let the following sentence be inscribed in letters of gold over the door of every home in the United States: The Son of Man Came into the World, Not To Destroy Men's Lives, But To Save Them.

5. To inspire a veneration for human life, and a horror at the shedding of human blood, let all those laws be repealed which authorize juries, judges, sheriffs, or hangmen to assume the resentments of individuals, and to commit murder in cold blood in any case whatever. . . .

6. To subdue that passion for war . . . militia laws should everywhere be repealed, and military dresses and military titles should be laid aside. . . .

- 1925: Carrie Chapman Catt, founder of the League of Women Voters, at the Cause and Cure for War Conference, publicly suggested a cabinet-level Department of Peace and secretary of peace be established.
- 1926/1927: Kirby Page, author of A National Peace Department, wrote, published and distributed a proposal for a cabinet-level Department of Peace and secretary of peace.
- 1935: Senator Matthew M. Neely (D-West Virginia) wrote and introduced the first bill calling for the creation of a United States Department of Peace. Reintroduced in 1937 and 1939.
- 1943: Senator Alexander Wiley (R-Wisconsin) spoke on the Senate floor calling for the United States of America to become the first government in the world to have a secretary of peace.
- 1945: Representative Louis Ludlow (D-Indiana) re-introduced a bill, S. 1237, to create a United States Department of Peace.
- 1946: Senator Jennings Randolph (D-West Virginia) re-introduced a bill to create a United States Department of Peace.
- 1947: Representative Everett Dirksen (R-Illinois) introduced a bill for “A Peace Division in the State Department”.
- 1955 to 1968: Eighty-five Senate and House of Representative bills were introduced calling for a United States Department of Peace.
- 1969: Senator Vance Hartke (D-Indiana) and Representative Seymour Halpern (R-New York) re-introduced bills to create a U.S. Department of Peace in the House of Representatives and the Senate. The 14 Senate cosponsors of S. 953, the "Peace Act", included Birch Bayh (D-IN), Robert Byrd (D-WV), Alan Cranston (D-CA), Daniel Inouye (D-HI) and Edmund Muskie (D-ME). The 67 House cosponsors included Ed Koch of New York, Donald Fraser of Minnesota, and Abner Mikva of Illinois, as well as Republican Pete McCloskey of California. The bill would have established a cabinet-level called for the new department to develop "plans, policies and programs designed to foster peace," coordinate all U.S. government activities affecting "the preservation or promotion of peace," to cooperate with other governments in planning for peaceful conflict resolution, and promote the exchange of ideas between private parties in the U.S. and other countries. The bill further provided for establishment of an International Peace Institute that would train citizens for service, a Peace by Investment Corporation, and the transfer of agencies such as the Peace Corps, Agency for International Development, and the International Agricultural Development Service, to the new department. The bill received popular support from anti-war groups, Catholic and Baptist publications, author Norman Cousins, and others.
- 1979: Senator Spark Matsunaga (D-Hawaii) re-introduced a bill, S. 2103, "Department of Peace Organization Act of 1979" to create a U.S. Department of Peace.
- 2001: Representative Dennis Kucinich (D-Ohio) introduced a bill to create a U.S. Department of Peace. A version of this bill was introduced in each session of Congress from 2001 to 2011. The bill was cosponsored by 76 members of Congress in 2007. In July 2008, the first Republican cosponsor, Rep. Wayne Gilchrest (R-MD) signed on.
- 2005: Senator Mark Dayton (D-Minnesota) introduced legislation in the Senate to create a cabinet-level Department of Peace a week after Dennis Kucinich introduced a similar bill in the House.
- 2013: Representative Barbara Lee (D-California) introduced a substantially similar bill to the Kucinich bill.

== Support ==
The Peace Alliance and the Student Peace Alliance organizations support the creation of a U.S. Department of Peace. Both are national nonprofit organizations and independent grassroots political movements that operate autonomously. The ongoing movement is supported by several members of Congress, the late former CBS Evening News anchor Walter Cronkite and author Marianne Williamson. Also joining the increasing list of national endorsements are Yoko Ono, Joaquin Phoenix, Frances Fisher and Willie Nelson. This movement actively lobbies for the endorsements of congressional leaders and is active in soliciting and receiving a growing list of bipartisan endorsements from city councils in California, Florida, Georgia, Illinois, Michigan, New Mexico and Ohio. Local grassroots chapters have been formed in all 50 states.

== Fiction ==
The novel 1988 (a fictional work about the upcoming 1988 presidential election published in 1985) by then-Governor of Colorado Richard Lamm, includes a very similar proposal where the third-party presidential candidate in the novel proposes a cabinet-level Agency for U.S. Peace and Conflict Resolution with a secretary of peace who could challenge the secretary of defense when necessary.

== See also ==
- List of peace activists
