= Seven Brides for Seven Brothers (TV series) =

American television series (1982–1983)

- Genre: Comedy-drama; Musical
- Based on: Seven Brides for Seven Brothers by: Albert Hackett; Frances Goodrich; Dorothy Kingsley
- Starring: Richard Dean Anderson; Drake Hogestyn; Peter Horton; River Phoenix
- Theme music composer: Jimmy Webb; Gary S. Scott
- Opening theme: "Seven Brides for Seven Brothers" performed by Phil Silas
- Composers: Larry Cansler; Fred Werner
- Country of origin: United States
- Original language: English
- No. of seasons: 1
- No. of episodes: 22

Production
- Executive producer: David Gerber
- Producers: James H. Brown; Stephen Cragg; Richard Fielder
- Running time: 60 minutes
- Production companies: David Gerber Productions; MGM Television

Original release
- Network: CBS
- Release: September 19, 1982 – March 23, 1983

Seven Brides for Seven Brothers is an American musical comedy-drama television series that aired on CBS from September 19, 1982, to March 23, 1983, loosely based on the 1954 film.

== Synopsis ==
The series tells the adventures of a parentless family of rowdy brothers trying to run the family ranch in northern California. Into the chaos comes feisty Hannah, who marries Adam and takes on the task of bringing order to the household. The series contains approximately one musical number per episode, written by songwriter Jimmy Webb. Despite a small but dedicated fan following, the series was canceled after one season.

== Cast and characters ==
- Richard Dean Anderson as 27-year-old Adam McFadden, eldest of the McFadden brothers who is married to Hannah. He is strong, responsible and true and does what he can to keep the family together.
- Drake Hogestyn as 25-year-old Brian McFadden, second of the McFadden brothers who helped raise the younger ones. He's a true cowboy with a quick temper and stubborn pride loving his family and the land. He often cooks the meals and looks after his younger brothers. Despite being somewhat stubborn and having his way with the ladies, Brian is loyal and supportive towards his brothers.
- Peter Horton as 23-year-old Crane McFadden, third of the McFadden brothers and a loyal, hardworking responsible rancher on the ranch, who takes care of the financials. His love interest is Molly McGraw, a veterinarian.
- Roger Wilson as 18-year-old Daniel McFadden, fourth of the McFadden brothers who has a passion for music and writing his own songs. He is fun loving, caring and loyal. His temporary love interest is Allison Freely in one episode while in high school.
- Tim Topper as 17-year-old Evan McFadden, fifth of the McFadden brothers who dreams of becoming a rodeo bronc rider like his hero Cooper Johnson. He is the spirited McFadden who flares up when he is passionate about things. He makes friends with Coop Johnson's daughter Jill, one of the girls who practices with him at the rodeo.
- Bryan Utman as 16-year-old Ford McFadden, sixth of the McFadden brothers. He is the quiet, meek and shyer McFadden, who likes animals and Cleo Wheeler, daughter of the scheming cattle rancher Mr. Wheeler.
- River Phoenix as 12-year-old Guthrie McFadden, seventh and youngest of the McFadden brothers who loves being outdoors, exploring and getting his hands dirty. He is loyal, courageous always wants to do what his bigger brothers are doing. He has a couple of friends, one of them is Kate Bancroft, a 12-year-old girl who enjoys the outdoors and catching frogs as much as Guthrie does.
- Terri Treas as 24-year-old Hannah McFadden, wife of Adam McFadden and sister-in-law of Adam's six younger brothers. She is a spirited, take charge kinda gal, and fits right into the family and appreciates the brothers for their musical talents.
- Pamela Newman as Jackie
- Joan Kjar as Marie

== Production ==
Seven Brides for Seven Brothers was executive produced by David Gerber for MGM Television and filmed on location at Murphys, California. The series' theme, "Seven Brides for Seven Brothers", was written by Jimmy Webb and performed by Phil Silas. The musical numbers were choreographed by Carl Jablonski. Michael J. Fox auditioned for this show, before auditioning successfully for Family Ties.

== Episodes ==
No.	Title	Directed by	Written by	Original release date
1	"Pilot"	Gary Nelson	Sue Grafton & Steven Humphrey	September 19, 1982
A spirited cafe waitress learns - after the fact - that she has married into a parentless but self-sufficient brood of seven rowdy brothers. After her initial shock has passed, Hannah turns her attention to taming the rough and tumble McFadden clan. It's almost impossible, though, when the brothers discover that their bull has been killed. The furious young men suspect Wheeler, a nearby ranch owner who would stop at nothing to force the McFaddens into selling their land. Knowing that the brothers want revenge, Hannah comes up with a plan to capture one of Wheeler's prized bulls to claim as their own.
2	"The Man in the White Hat"	James Sheldon	Marshall Herskovitz	September 22, 1982
Having persuaded his brothers to borrow heavily to buy grain at a low price and store it in Freleng's Warehouse, Crane feels responsible for the family's financial distress after the grain is seized when Freleng declares bankruptcy. Crane is arrested and jailed for instigating ranchers to raid the warehouse to take their grain back when it is seized by authorities. At his court hearing, ordered by the judge to identify his co-conspirators in the raid, Crane refuses, taking full responsibility and maintaining that, in this case, the law perversely harmed innocent citizens.
3	"Challenges"	Harvey S. Laidman	Mitzie Marvin	September 29, 1982
With Hannah pushing him, Ford struggles to overcome his shyness and ask pretty Cleo to a barn dance. Meanwhile, Evan's self-confidence is challenged when his hero, former rodeo champion Cooper Johnson, twice rejects him in rodeo-class tryouts. Later, Adam and Hannah fight over the difference between encouragement and badgering: Hannah accuses Adam of pushing Evan to try one more time to get into Cooper's class, and Adam says Hannah is forcing Ford into dating girls when he's not ready yet.
4	"I Love You Molly McGraw"	Vincent McEveety	Story by : Tim Maschler; Teleplay by : Sue Grafton & Steven Humphrey	October 6, 1982
When Evan's horse, Diablo, suffers a broken leg, pretty Molly McGraw is the only veterinarian available to perform the surgery that's needed. She and Crane fall head over heels for each other, but Crane's stubborn McFadden pride resists when Molly soon thereafter tells him she has received the internship in equine surgery she has been seeking - a commitment that means she will have to leave California and move back East.
5	"Gold Fever"	Burt Kennedy	Josef Anderson	October 13, 1982
Ford is signed by a talent scout to be a back-up singer. Meanwhile, Guthrie, anxious to contribute something as the McFaddens try to scrape up the money for a new roof, hits upon panning for gold. When he chances on two armed men seeming to be prospecting downstream, he goes along with their idea that he teams up with them, not knowing they are poachers, shooting bears out of season, and are wanted by the authorities.
6	"Daniel's Song"	Bernard L. Kowalski	C.E. Lewis	October 20, 1982
Daniel considers himself lucky when he is asked to fill in for High Sierra's injured guitar player. But soon after he and singer Tally Dean fall in love, he learns that Tally is determined to make her mark in big-time music, no matter what, then feels betrayed when Brian tells him he and Tally once had a short-lived but intense romance.
7	"A House Divided"	Vincent McEveety	Sue Grafton & Steven Humphrey	October 27, 1982
Just before a big game, Adam, as eldest brother, takes the responsibility for removing Brian from the family's mountain polo team because of Brian's reckless showing-off on horseback. This angers Brian who goes on a bender and ends up in jail. The argument between Adam and Brian creates a rift among some of the other brothers as well, who regard Brian as crucial to the game, and especially disturbs young Guthrie, who idolizes both of them.
8	"Rodeo"	John Patterson	Preston Ransone	November 3, 1982
Evan learns rodeo riding from hard-bitten ex-champion Cooper Johnson, but to Adam's dismay, he plans to drop out of high school to join the rodeo circuit. However, after watching Coop verbally lash Evan and the other young people in the rodeo school, Brian loses his temper and challenges Coop to a fight. Only later does he learn of Coop's special relationship with Sally, one of the girls in the class whom Coop has been riding the hardest. Meanwhile, Adam and Hannah try every means to persuade Evan to stay in high school.
9	"Catch a Falling Star"	Peter Levin	Paul L. Ehrmann	November 10, 1982
Daniel befriends Stormy Weathers, an alcoholic former country-music star whom he idolizes and tries to help him get back on his feet and resume his career. But Stormy's presence creates a bitter conflict within the family, and several of the brothers feel that Daniel is wasting time on Stormy, whom they see as a loser, and that Stormy's furtive drinking is a bad influence on Guthrie.
10	"The Election"	Michael O'Herlihy	Ira Steven Behr	November 24, 1982
The McFaddens are up in arms after Guthrie is poisoned by polluted water in a stream on their property, but when Buck Tanner, long-time sheriff of Carbon County, stalls and delays the promised investigations, Adam concludes that he must be protecting someone, and decides to run for the office himself. As he begins his campaign, however, Adam learns that certain parties in the county will stop at nothing to destroy his candidacy.
11	"Neighbors"	Bernard L. Kowalski	Elizabeth Clark	December 8, 1982
Soon after Sophie Barton (Laraine Stephens), a beautiful young divorcee and single parent from San Francisco, moves into the run-down ranch she has inherited down the road from the McFadden spread, she and Hannah hit it off. But sparks fly when Sophie tells Adam he can no longer graze McFadden cattle on her land, breaking an agreement going back more than 30 years between her grandfather and Adam's father.
12	"Dreams"	John Florea	Marshall Herskovitz	December 15, 1982
After meeting the warm, close-knit McFadden family, Ben Shepard, a guarded man who keeps his past and personal life a mystery, finds it hard to believe that Brian would want to give it all up for a life of wandering the West, always alone. But Brian, restless and anxious to split from the ranch, falls in with the brawling, footloose loner, who seems to lead the kind of life Brian is looking for. Meanwhile, Evan loses concentration in football practice by ogling the cheerleaders and is ordered by the coach to spend a week in the girls' dance class -- some "punishment."
13	"Christmas Song"	Robert C. Thompson	Richard Fielder	December 22, 1982
At Christmas time, Meg Palmer, recently widowed and working from job to job to support her kids, mistakes Crane and Daniel's intentions when they try to help her when her car breaks down and lashes out at them. She soon accepts the McFadden family's generosity as genuine but faces the struggle of her life as her deceased husband's parents sue in court for custody of her three children.
14	"Heritage"	John Patterson	Richard Fielder	December 29, 1982
Hannah's impassioned protest and armed stand against the bulldozer demolition of the oldest building in Murphys, the original schoolhouse where her great-grandmother once taught, falls on deaf ears in the community, even among the McFadden men, because a factory is to be built in its place, and jobs mean more to many families than preserving a bit of local history, even though the construction company gained title to the land by unscrupulous means. Meanwhile, Guthrie runs into a mini-scandal as well, when his frog, "Loser", is swiped just before the First Annual Carbon County Frog-Jumping Derby.
15	"Promised Land"	John Patterson	Paul L. Ehrmann	January 5, 1983
Evan and Hannah find a pregnant young illegal alien, Angelina, hiding in the barn, ravenous and frightened from days of running for her life after witnessing her husband's murder at the hands of smugglers now out to kill her, and her baby is due at any time. The McFaddens give her shelter, but Angelina runs away again, not knowing that in return for her help in the case against the farm-labor smugglers, the authorities can offer her protection and citizenship.
16	"The Killer"	Barry Crane	Jud Scott	January 12, 1983
Brian teaches Guthrie how to hunt, and also to respect all wild animals, but Guthrie is not sure he could shoot to kill. Several days later, Adam risks being mauled when he and his brothers track and corner "Old Scarback", a wounded mountain lion suspected of killing local livestock. When Adam is knocked unconscious in a fall in the woods, Guthrie is forced to make a life-or-death decision when he sees the cougar crouched over Adam.
17	"Deadly High"	John Florea	Steve Hayes	January 26, 1983
Angry marijuana growers open fire on the McFaddens when the brothers begin searching the hills for the police, who are looking to bust a large-scale pot-growing operation in Carbon County. While his older brothers are risking their lives trying to find the hidden marijuana fields before the illicit crop can be harvested, Guthrie confronts a couple of older boys at his junior high school who are forcing younger kids to buy "weed" from them.
18	"The Rescue"	Barry Crane	Jud Scott	February 9, 1983
During a blizzard, the sheriff asks Hannah and four others trained in first aid to fly into an isolated mountain community where botulism has broken out. Then the plane goes down and they lose radio contact. Adam sets out to backpack into the mountains to rescue them, against the advice of the National Guard, who cannot provide air support until the storm breaks. Meanwhile, Hannah calls on all her inner strength to help keep the survivors, including the gravely wounded pilot, alive and hopeful of rescue.
19	"Winter Roses"	John Florea	Michael Petryni	February 9, 1983
Adam has never had the proper car to win the Gold Rush Race, but this year has found a truly hot machine. When Hannah tells the family she is three months pregnant, Adam decides to drop out, not wanting to risk his life racing on hazardous back-country dirt roads. But Hannah, who knows how much the race means to Adam, insists he go through with it. Adam burns up the road racing against a professional driver in the dangerous race, unaware that Hannah has had complications and has been rushed to the hospital.
20	"Winner"	James Sheldon	Story by : Michael Brentwood; Teleplay by : Joel Steiger	March 2, 1983
Adam, a star of the 1972 Murphys High School basketball team, expects to have a good time reliving that championship season at his class's tenth reunion. But six head of cattle stolen from the McFadden Ranch, followed by a murder, draw Adam away from the reunion. As he, Brian and Crane arm themselves to lead the search for the rustlers, Adam can't help but wonder at the coincidence that his old friend Mike has just returned to Murphys after an absence of years to start up a cattle ranch.
21	"A Ring for Hannah"	James Sheldon	Joe Viola	March 9, 1983
Daniel's idea is to find enough small gold nuggets for the brothers to have fashioned into a ring for their sister-in-law, Hannah. Disregarding the warning of the owner of the abandoned Howling Man Gold Mine to stay out, feeling that his experience as a spelunker, or cave explorer, is caution enough, Daniel takes his younger brothers. When the mine tunnel collapses, Daniel frees himself but bears all the blame from the distraught mine owner, whose daughter is trapped by the cave-in with Evan, Ford, and Guthrie, and rescuers fear a total collapse at any minute. Guthrie (River Phoenix) sings a solo of "Rock Around the Clock" for Guest Star Louanne before they are rescued.
22	"Roundup"	John Patterson	Earl W. Wallace	March 23, 1983
As the McFaddens prepare for a cattle roundup in the high country, where packs of rabid coyotes have been attacking the herd, Adam decides that Hannah's proper place is at the ranch and that Daniel, who wants to stay back to rehearse for an audition, has to go. When Hannah shows up anyway, Adam's irritation and Daniel's simmering frustration boil over into a family feud, leading Adam to send Hannah back to the ranch. Later, Hannah, unarmed, must defend Evan, who has been knocked unconscious in a fall, from a maddened rabid coyote.

== Reception ==
=== Ratings ===
Season	Episodes	Start date	End date	Nielsen rank	Nielsen rating
1982–83	22	September 19, 1982	March 23, 1983	65	N/A

=== Awards and nominations ===
Year	Award	Category	Recipient	Result	Refs
1983	Emmy Awards	Outstanding Art Direction for a Series	Hub Braden and Donald J. Remacle (for episode: "The Rescue")	Nominated	
1983	Young Artist Awards	Best Young Actor in a New Television Series	River Phoenix	Nominated	
1983	Young Artist Awards	Best New Family Television Series	Seven Brides for Seven Brothers	Nominated	
1984	Young Artist Awards	Best Young Actor in a Drama Series	River Phoenix	Won	
