= List of awards and nominations received by Joaquin Phoenix =

American Actor

Joaquin Phoenix awards and nominations
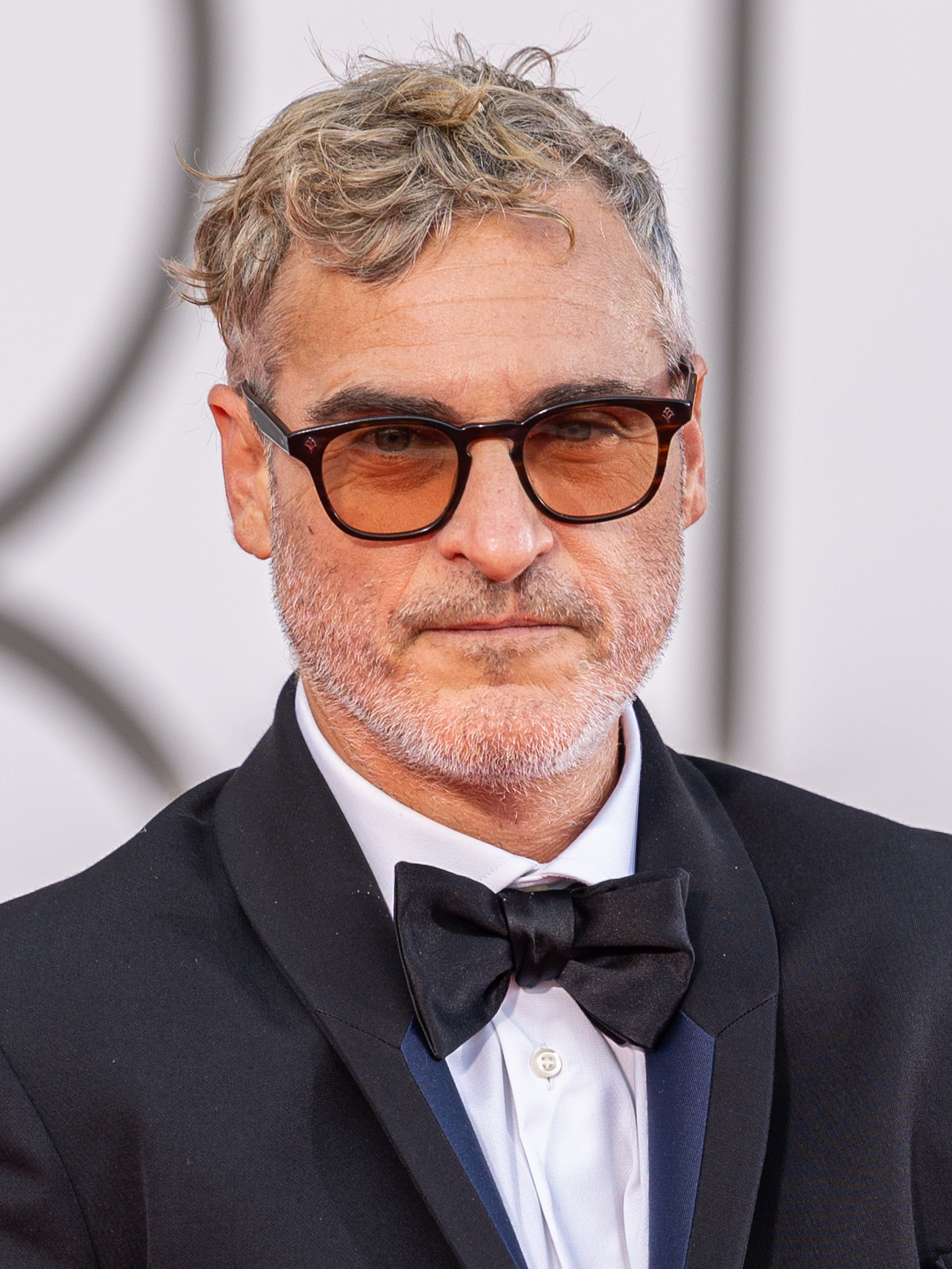
- Phoenix at the Venice Film Festival
Awards and nominations
Award	Wins	Nominations
Academy Awards	1	4
BAFTA Awards	1	4
Critics' Choice	2	4
Golden Globes	2	7
Grammy Awards	1	1
SAG Awards	1	5

Totals (Note: Certain award groups do not simply award one winner. They acknowledge several different recipients, have runners-up, and have third place. Since this is a specific recognition and is different from losing an award, runner-up mentions are considered wins in this award tally. For simplification and to avoid errors, each award in this list has been presumed to have had a prior nomination.)
- Wins: 47
- Nominations: 121

Joaquin Phoenix is an American actor known for his leading performances in film. Over his career he has received several accolades including an Academy Award, an Actor Award, a British Academy Film Award, two Critics' Choice Awards, two Golden Globes, and a Grammy Award, as well as Best Actor prizes from both the Cannes Film Festival and the Venice International Film Festival.

Phoenix received the Academy Award for Best Actor for his role as Arthur Fleck / Arthur in the psychological thriller Joker (2019). He was Oscar-nominated for playing a corrupt Roman Emperor in the epic historical action-drama Gladiator (2000), country music star Johnny Cash in the biographical musical drama Walk the Line (2005), and a traumatized war veteran in the psychological drama The Master (2012). He also won the Cannes Film Festival Award for Best Actor for playing a hired enforcer in the neo-noir crime thriller You Were Never Really Here (2017) and the Venice International Film Festival's Volpi Cup for Best Actor for his performance in the drama The Master (2012).

As a child he, was briefly credited as Leaf Phoenix. For his role in the 1984 ABC Afterschool Special Backwards: The Riddle of Dyslexia he was nominated for the Young Artist Award for Best Young Actor in a Family Film Made for Television, with his brother River Phoenix. For the 1989 comedy Parenthood he was nominated for the Young Artist Award for Best Leading Young Actor in a Feature Film.

Phoenix's breakthrough role in Ridley Scott's Gladiator earned him the Critics' Choice Award and the National Board of Review Award for Best Supporting Actor, and he was nominated for the Academy Award, the Golden Globe Award, and the BAFTA Award. In 2005, Phoenix starred in the biographical drama Walk the Line, in which he played the American singer Johnny Cash. For his performance, he won the Golden Globe Award, the Hollywood Film Award for Best Actor, and the Grammy Award for Best Compilation Soundtrack for Visual Media, and he was nominated for the Academy Award, the BAFTA Award, and the Actor Award for Best Actor in a Leading Role.

In 2012, Phoenix starred in the psychological drama The Master, for which he won the Volpi Cup for Best Actor and the Los Angeles Film Critics Association Award, and he was nominated for the Academy Award, the BAFTA Award, and the Golden Globe Award for Best Actor. In 2013, Phoenix starred in romantic science-fiction drama Her, for which he was nominated for the Golden Globe Award for Best Actor – Motion Picture Musical or Comedy. In 2017, he starred in the psychological thriller You Were Never Really Here. For this film, Phoenix won the Cannes Film Festival Award for Best Actor. In 2019, Phoenix starred as Arthur Fleck/Joker in Joker. His performance went on to win the Academy Award for Best Actor, BAFTA Award for Best Actor in a Leading Role, and the Golden Globe Award for Best Actor – Motion Picture Drama. Phoenix received his seventh Golden Globe nomination for his performance in the tragicomedy horror film, Beau Is Afraid (2023).

== Major associations ==
=== Academy Awards ===
Year	Category	Nominated work	Result	Ref.
2001	Best Supporting Actor	Gladiator	Nominated	
2006	Best Actor	Walk the Line	Nominated	
2013	Best Actor	The Master	Nominated	
2020	Best Actor	Joker	Won	

=== BAFTA Awards ===
Year	Category	Nominated work	Result	Ref.
2001	Best Actor in a Supporting Role	Gladiator	Nominated	
2006	Best Actor in a Leading Role	Walk the Line	Nominated	
2013	Best Actor in a Leading Role	The Master	Nominated	
2020	Best Actor in a Leading Role	Joker	Won	

Outstanding British Film: 2024 - Napoleon

=== Critics' Choice Awards ===
Year	Category	Nominated work	Result	Ref.
Critics' Choice Movie Awards
2001	Best Supporting Actor	Gladiator / Quills / The Yards	Won	
2006	Best Actor	Walk the Line	Nominated	
2013	Best Actor	The Master	Nominated	
2020	Best Actor	Joker	Won	

=== Golden Globe Awards ===
Year	Category	Nominated work	Result	Ref.
2001	Best Supporting Actor – Motion Picture	Gladiator	Nominated	
2006	Best Actor in a Motion Picture – Musical or Comedy	Walk the Line	Won	
2013	Best Actor in a Motion Picture – Drama	The Master	Nominated	
2014	Best Actor in a Motion Picture – Musical or Comedy	Her	Nominated	
2015	Best Actor in a Motion Picture – Musical or Comedy	Inherent Vice	Nominated	
2020	Best Actor in a Motion Picture – Drama	Joker	Won	
2024	Best Actor in a Motion Picture – Musical or Comedy	Beau Is Afraid	Nominated	

=== Grammy Awards ===
Year	Category	Nominated work	Result	Ref.
2007	Best Compilation Soundtrack for Visual Media	Walk the Line	Won	

=== Screen Actors Guild Awards ===
Year	Category	Nominated work	Result	Ref.
2001	Outstanding Male Actor in a Supporting Role	Gladiator	Nominated	
2001	Outstanding Cast in a Motion Picture	Gladiator	Nominated	
2005	Outstanding Cast in a Motion Picture	Hotel Rwanda	Nominated	
2006	Outstanding Male Actor in a Leading Role	Walk the Line	Nominated	
2020	Outstanding Male Actor in a Leading Role	Joker	Won	

== Miscellaneous accolades ==
Awards and nominations received by Joaquin Phoenix
Award	Year	Category	Project	Result	Ref.
AACTA Awards	2013	Best Actor	The Master	Nominated	
AACTA Awards	2020	Best Actor	Joker	Nominated	
American Latino Media Arts Award	2009	Year in Film – Actor	Two Lovers	Nominated	
Alliance of Women Film Journalists Awards	2013	Best Actor	The Master	Nominated	
Alliance of Women Film Journalists Awards	2014	Best Actor	Her	Nominated	
Alliance of Women Film Journalists Awards	2014	Best Depiction of Nudity, Sexuality, or Seduction (Note: shared with Scarlett Johansson)	Her	Won	
Alliance of Women Film Journalists Awards	2020	Best Actor	Joker	Nominated	
Austin Film Critics Association Awards	2012	Best Actor	The Master	Won	
Austin Film Critics Association Awards	2019	Best Actor	You Were Never Really Here	Nominated	
British Independent Film Awards	2003	Best Actor	Buffalo Soldiers	Nominated	
British Independent Film Awards	2018	Best Actor	You Were Never Really Here	Nominated	
Blockbuster Entertainment Award	2001	Favorite Villain	Gladiator	Won	
Boston Society of Film Critics Award	2019	Best Actor	Joker	Runner-up	
Chicago Film Critics Association Awards	2005	Best Actor	Walk the Line	Nominated	
Chicago Film Critics Association Awards	2012	Best Actor	The Master	Nominated	
Chicago Film Critics Association Awards	2018	Best Actor	You Were Never Really Here	Nominated	
Chicago Film Critics Association Awards	2019	Best Actor	Joker	Nominated	
Cannes Film Festival Award	2017	Best Actor	You Were Never Really Here	Won	
Capri Hollywood International Film Festival Award	2019	Best Actor	Joker	Won	
Dorian Awards	2013	Film Performance of the Year – Actor	The Master	Nominated	
Dorian Awards	2020	Film Performance of the Year – Actor	Joker	Nominated	
Dallas–Fort Worth Film Critics Association Awards	2005	Best Actor	Walk the Line	4th place	
Dallas–Fort Worth Film Critics Association Awards	2012	Best Actor	The Master	Runner-up	
Dallas–Fort Worth Film Critics Association Awards	2019	Best Actor	Joker	Runner-up	
Detroit Film Critics Society Awards	2012	Best Actor	The Master	Nominated	
Detroit Film Critics Society Awards	2019	Best Actor	Joker	Nominated	
Dublin Film Critics' Circle Awards	2012	Best Actor	The Master	Won	
Dublin Film Critics' Circle Awards	2014	Best Actor (Note: tied with Bill Hader for The Skeleton Twins, Chiwetel Ejiofor for 12 Years a Slave and Tom Hardy for Locke)	Her	10th place	
Dublin Film Critics' Circle Awards	2018	Best Actor	You Were Never Really Here	Runner-up	
Dublin Film Critics' Circle Awards	2019	Best Actor	Joker	Runner-up	
Florida Film Critics Circle Awards	2013	Best Actor	Her	Runner-up	
Florida Film Critics Circle Awards	2018	Best Actor	You Were Never Really Here	Won	
Florida Film Critics Circle Awards	2019	Best Actor	Joker	Nominated	
Georgia Film Critics Association Awards	2013	Best Actor	The Master	Nominated	
Georgia Film Critics Association Awards	2014	Best Actor	Her	Nominated	
Georgia Film Critics Association Awards	2020	Best Actor	Joker	Nominated	
Golden Raspberry Awards	2025	Worst Actor	Joker: Folie à Deux	Nominated	
Golden Raspberry Awards	2025	Worst Screen Combo (Note: shared with Lady Gaga)	Joker: Folie à Deux	Won	
Gotham Awards	2021	Outstanding Lead Performance	C'mon C'mon	Nominated	
Hollywood Critics Association Award	2020	Best Actor	Joker	Won	
Houston Film Critics Society Awards	2013	Best Actor	The Master	Nominated	
Houston Film Critics Society Awards	2020	Best Actor	Joker	Nominated	
Hollywood Film Festival Award	2005	Best Actor	Walk the Line	Won	
Independent Spirit Awards	2015	Robert Altman Award (Note: shared with cast of Inherent Vice)	Inherent Vice	Won	
Independent Spirit Awards	2019	Best Male Lead	You Were Never Really Here	Nominated	
Irish Film & Television Academy Award	2013	Best International Actor	The Master	Nominated	
IndieWire Critics Poll Awards	2009	Best Actor	Two Lovers	Nominated	
IndieWire Critics Poll Awards	2018	Best Actor	You Were Never Really Here	Runner-up	
IndieWire Critics Poll Awards	2019	Best Actor	Joker	4th place	
International Cinephile Society Awards	2010	Best Actor	Two Lovers	Nominated	
International Cinephile Society Awards	2013	Best Actor	The Master	Nominated	
International Cinephile Society Awards	2014	Best Actor	Her	Runner-up	
London Film Critics' Circle Awards	2013	Actor of the Year	The Master	Won	
London Film Critics' Circle Awards	2019	Actor of the Year	You Were Never Really Here	Nominated	
London Film Critics' Circle Awards	2020	Actor of the Year	Joker	Won	
Los Angeles Film Critics Association Award	2012	Best Actor	The Master	Won	
MTV Movie & TV Awards	2001	Best Villain	Gladiator	Nominated	
MTV Movie & TV Awards	2001	Best Line from a Movie	Gladiator	Nominated	
MTV Movie & TV Awards	2006	Best Performance	Walk the Line	Nominated	
National Board of Review Award	2000	Best Supporting Actor	Gladiator / Quills / The Yards	Won	
National Society of Film Critics Awards	2013	Best Actor (Note: tied with Denis Lavant for Holy Motors)	The Master	Runner-up	
National Society of Film Critics Awards	2015	Best Actor (Note: tied with Ralph Fiennes for The Grand Budapest Hotel)	Inherent Vice	3rd place	
New York Film Critics Circle Award	2013	Best Actor	The Master	Nominated	
New York Film Critics Online Award	2019	Best Actor	Joker	Won	
Online Film Critics Society Awards	2006	Best Actor	Walk the Line	Nominated	
Online Film Critics Society Awards	2009	Best Actor	Two Lovers	Nominated	
Online Film Critics Society Awards	2012	Best Actor	The Master	Nominated	
Online Film Critics Society Awards	2013	Best Actor	Her	Nominated	
Online Film Critics Society Awards	2019	Best Actor	You Were Never Really Here	Nominated	
Online Film Critics Society Awards	2020	Best Actor	Joker	Nominated	
People's Choice Award	2008	Favorite Leading Man	We Own the Night	Won	
Palm Springs International Film Festival Award	2020	Chairman's Award	Joker	Won	
Satellite Awards	2012	Best Actor – Motion Picture	The Master	Nominated	
Satellite Awards	2019	Best Actor – Motion Picture Drama	Joker	Nominated	
Satellite Awards	2021	Best Actor – Motion Picture Drama	C'mon C'mon	Nominated	
San Diego Film Critics Society Awards	2000	Body of Work	Gladiator / Quills / The Yards	Won	
San Diego Film Critics Society Awards	2012	Best Actor	The Master	Nominated	
San Diego Film Critics Society Awards	2013	Best Actor	Her	Nominated	
San Diego Film Critics Society Awards	2019	Best Actor (Note: tied with Adam Driver for Marriage Story)	Joker	Won	
San Francisco Bay Area Film Critics Circle Awards	2012	Best Actor	The Master	Won	
San Francisco Bay Area Film Critics Circle Awards	2019	Best Actor	Joker	Nominated	
Seattle Film Critics Society Awards	2018	Best Actor	You Were Never Really Here	Nominated	
Seattle Film Critics Society Awards	2019	Best Actor	Joker	Nominated	
Seattle Film Critics Society Awards	2019	Best Villain of the Year	Joker	Nominated	
St. Louis Film Critics Association Award	2019	Best Actor	Joker	Runner-up	
San Diego International Film Festival Award	2005	—	Humanitarian Award	Won	
Toronto Film Critics Association Award	2012	Best Actor	The Master	Runner-up	
Teen Choice Award	2005	Choice Movie Actor: Drama	Ladder 49	Nominated	
Toronto International Film Festival Award	2019	TIFF Tribute Actor Award	—	Won	
Vancouver Film Critics Circle Awards	2013	Best Actor	The Master	Won	
Vancouver Film Critics Circle Awards	2019	Best Actor	Joker	Nominated	
Village Voice Film Poll Awards	2009	Best Actor	Two Lovers	4th place	
Village Voice Film Poll Awards	2012	Best Actor	The Master	Won	
Village Voice Film Poll Awards	2013	Best Actor	Her	3rd place	
Venice Film Festival Award	2012	Volpi Cup for Best Actor (Note: tied with Philip Seymour Hoffman)	The Master	Won	
Washington D.C. Area Film Critics Association Awards	2005	Best Actor	Walk the Line	Nominated	
Washington D.C. Area Film Critics Association Awards	2012	Best Actor	The Master	Nominated	
Washington D.C. Area Film Critics Association Awards	2013	Best Actor	Her	Nominated	
Washington D.C. Area Film Critics Association Awards	2019	Best Actor	Joker	Nominated	
Women Film Critics Circle Award	2019	Best Actor	Joker	Runner-up	
Young Artist Awards	1984	Best Young Actor in Television Movie (Note: with River Phoenix)	Backwards: The Riddle of Dyslexia	Nominated	
Young Artist Awards	1990	Best Leading Young Actor in a Feature Film	Parenthood	Nominated	
