= Joaquin Phoenix filmography =

Performances by American actor

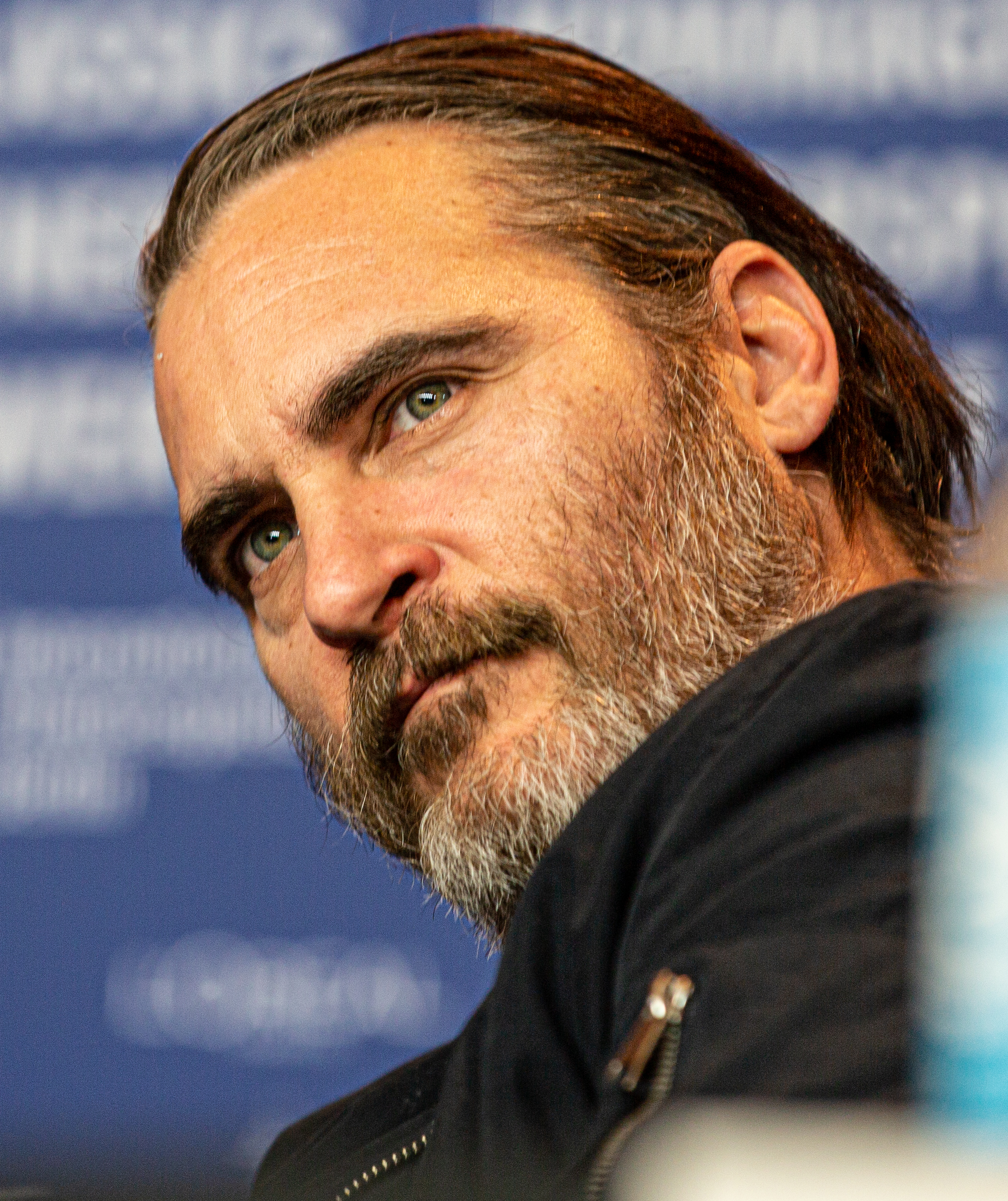
Phoenix at the 2018 Berlin International Film Festival

Joaquin Phoenix is an American actor who started his career performing as a child on television. He appeared on the shows Seven Brides for Seven Brothers (1982) and Backwards: The Riddle of Dyslexia (1984) with his brother River Phoenix and on an episode of Murder, She Wrote (1984) with his sister Summer Phoenix. He made his feature film debut in SpaceCamp (1986) and had his first starring role in Russkies (1987). His first major film release was Ron Howard's dramedy Parenthood (1989) with Steve Martin. During his period as a child actor, he was credited as Leaf Phoenix, his self-given name. Six years later, he changed his name back to Joaquin and co-starred opposite Nicole Kidman in the Gus Van Sant-directed crime comedy-drama To Die For (1995), a critical hit. In 1997, Phoenix co-starred in Oliver Stone's crime thriller U Turn opposite Sean Penn and starred opposite Liv Tyler in the coming-of-age film Inventing the Abbotts. Phoenix starred in the crime-comedy film Clay Pigeons (1998), Return to Paradise (1998) followed by a role in the crime mystery thriller 8mm (1999) with Nicolas Cage. Phoenix's first role in 2000 was in his first collaboration with director James Gray in the crime film The Yards. He followed this with supporting roles in the Ridley Scott-directed historical epic Gladiator (2000) opposite Russell Crowe and as priest Abbé de Coulmier in the Philip Kaufman-directed period film Quills (2000), opposite Geoffrey Rush. For his role as the villain Commodus in the former, Phoenix earned a nomination for the Academy Award for Best Supporting Actor.

The following year he starred in a satire of the US military, Buffalo Soldiers (2001). Phoenix starred opposite Mel Gibson in the science fiction thriller Signs (2002), a massive commercial success. He starred in the romance-drama It's All About Love (2003) and voiced Kenai in the animated film Brother Bear. In 2004, Phoenix starred as a farmer in the psychological thriller The Village and as a Baltimore firefighter in the drama Ladder 49. He followed this with a supporting role in the historical drama film Hotel Rwanda (2004). Phoenix portrayed musician Johnny Cash in the biopic Walk the Line (2005) opposite Reese Witherspoon. Phoenix played and sang all of Cash's vocal tracks in the film and on the accompanying soundtrack. This earned him the Golden Globe Award for Best Actor – Motion Picture Musical or Comedy, Grammy Award for Best Compilation Soundtrack for Visual Media and garnered his first nomination for the Academy Award for Best Actor. He also narrated the animal rights documentary Earthlings (2005). This was followed by a reteam with Gray in the crime drama We Own the Night (2007) and the lead role in the drama Reservation Road (2007) opposite Mark Ruffalo. The following year, he made his third film with Gray, Two Lovers (2008) and followed this with the mockumentary I'm Still Here (2010). Throughout the filming period, Phoenix remained in character for public appearances, giving many the impression that he was genuinely pursuing a new career as a rapper.

Phoenix starred as a World War II veteran in the Paul Thomas Anderson-directed drama film The Master opposite Philip Seymour Hoffman. The role earned him a Volpi Cup and his second nomination for the Academy Award for Best Actor. The following year, he reteamed with Gray once again in the drama film The Immigrant opposite Marion Cotillard. Phoenix starred as a man who develops a relationship with Samantha, an intelligent computer operating system in the Spike Jonze-directed romantic science fiction film Her (2013) and starred as a private investigator when he reteamed with Anderson in the film adaptation of Thomas Pynchon's novel Inherent Vice (2014). Both roles earned him nominations for the Golden Globe Award for Best Actor – Motion Picture Musical or Comedy. In 2017, his performance as the damaged savior of sex-trafficking victims in You Were Never Really Here netted him the Cannes Film Festival Award for Best Actor. In 2019, his portrayal as Arthur Fleck in the psychological thriller Joker earned him critical acclaim along with his first Academy Award for Best Actor, among other accolades.

== Film ==
Year	Title	Role	Notes
1985	Kids Don't Tell	Frankie	
1986	SpaceCamp	Max Graham	
1987	Russkies	Danny	
1988	Secret Witness	Drew Highsmith	(credited as Leaf Phoenix); CBS Movie Special
1989	Parenthood	Garry Buckman	(credited as Leaf Phoenix)
1995	To Die For	Jimmy Emmett	
1997	Inventing the Abbotts	Doug Holt	
1997	U Turn	Toby N. Tucker	
1998	Return to Paradise	Lewis McBride	
1998	Clay Pigeons	Clay Bidwell	
1999	8mm	Max California	
2000	The Yards	Willie Gutierrez	
2000	Gladiator	Commodus	
2000	Quills	Abbé de Coulmier	
2001	Buffalo Soldiers	Ray Elwood	
2002	Signs	Merrill Hess	
2003	It's All About Love	John	
2003	Brother Bear	Kenai (voice)	
2004	The Village	Lucius Hunt	
2004	Hotel Rwanda	Jack Daglish	
2004	Ladder 49	Jack Morrison	
2005	Earthlings	Narrator (voice)	Documentary
2005	Walk the Line	Johnny Cash	
2007	We Own the Night	Bobby Green	Also producer
2007	Reservation Road	Ethan Learner	
2008	Two Lovers	Leonard Kraditor	
2010	I'm Still Here	Himself	Mockumentary; also co-writer and producer
2012	The Master	Freddie Quell	
2013	The Immigrant	Bruno Weiss	
2013	Her	Theodore Twombly	
2014	Inherent Vice	Larry "Doc" Sportello	
2015	Irrational Man	Abe Lucas	
2015	Unity	Narrator (voice)	Documentary
2017	You Were Never Really Here	Joe	
2018	Don't Worry, He Won't Get Far on Foot	John Callahan	
2018	Mary Magdalene	Jesus	
2018	Dominion	Narrator (voice)	Documentary
2018	The Sisters Brothers	Charlie Sisters	
2019	Joker	Arthur Fleck / Joker	
2021	C'mon C'mon	Johnny	
2023	Beau Is Afraid	Beau Wassermann	
2023	Napoleon	Napoleon Bonaparte	Also producer
2024	Joker: Folie à Deux	Arthur Fleck / Joker	
2025	Eddington	Sheriff Joe Cross	
TBA	De Noche	—N/a	Story co-writer only

== Television ==
Year	Title	Role	Notes
1982	Seven Brides for Seven Brothers	Travis	Episode: "Christmas Song"
1984	The Fall Guy	Kid	Episode: "Terror U."
1984	ABC Afterschool Special	Robby Ellsworth	Episode: "Backwards: The Riddle of Dyslexia"
1984	Hill Street Blues	Daniel	Episode: "The Rise and Fall of Paul the Wall"
1984	Murder, She Wrote	Billy Donovan	Episode: "We're Off to Kill the Wizard"
1986	Alfred Hitchcock Presents	Pagey Fisher	Episode: "A Very Happy Ending"
1986	Morningstar/Eveningstar	Doug Roberts	7 episodes
1989	The New Leave It to Beaver	Kyle Cleaver	Episode: "Still the New Leave It to Beaver"
1989	Superboy	Billy Hercules	Episode: "Little Hercules"

== Executive producer only ==
Year	Title	Notes
2007	4Real	Reality series
2016	I Am Dying	Documentary
2017	What the Health	Documentary
2017	Across My Land	Short film
2019	The Animal People	Documentary
2020	Gunda	Documentary
2021	Indigo	Documentary short
2022	The End of Medicine	Documentary
2022	Stutz	Documentary
2025	The Voice of Hind Rajab	Documentary-thriller

== See also ==
- List of awards and nominations received by Joaquin Phoenix
