= Fred Burrell =

Fred Burrell may refer to:

- Fred J. Burrell (1889–1955), Massachusetts businessman and politician
- Fred Burrell (actor) (1936–2018), American actor
