= 11th ALMA Awards =

2009 US film and television awards ceremony

- Date: September 17, 2009
- Site: Royce Hall, Los Angeles, California
- Hosted by: Eva Longoria and George Lopez
- Official website: www.almaawards.com

Television coverage
- Network: ABC

The 11th ALMA Awards honored the accomplishments made by Hispanics in film, television, and music in 2008. The ceremony was held on September 17, 2009 at the Royce Hall.

The ceremony aired on ABC for the last time after 9 years, moving to NBC in 2011.

== Winners and nominees ==
The following is a list of the nominees from film, television, and music; the winners are bolded.

=== Year in TV Drama – Actor ===
- **Benjamin Bratt, The Cleaner**
- Carlos Bernard, 24
- Nestor Carbonell, Lost
- Cristian de la Fuente, In Plain Sight
- Jorge Garcia, Lost
- Benito Martinez, The Shield
- Esai Morales, Jericho
- Enrique Murciano, Without A Trace
- Amaury Nolasco, Prison Break
- Edward James Olmos, Battlestar Galactica
- Danny Pino, Cold Case
- Adam Rodriguez, CSI: Miami
- Miguel Sandoval, Medium
- Jimmy Smits, Dexter
- David Zayas, Dexter

=== Year in TV Drama – Actress ===
- **Lauren Vélez, Dexter**
- Laura Cerón, ER
- Alana De La Garza, Law & Order
- Cote de Pablo, NCIS
- Paula Garcés, The Shield
- Julie Gonzalo, Eli Stone
- Eva La Rue, CSI: Miami
- Justina Machado, ER
- Dania Ramirez, Heroes
- Francia Raisa, The Secret Life of the American Teenager
- Sara Ramirez, Grey's Anatomy
- Michelle Rodriguez, Lost
- Roselyn Sanchez, Without A Trace
- Paola Turbay, The Secret Life of the American Teenager; The Closer

=== Year in TV Comedy – Actor ===
- **Oscar Nuñez, The Office**
- Jake T. Austin, Wizards of Waverly Place (Disney Channel)
- Demián Bichir, Weeds (Showtime)
- Ricardo Antonio Chavira, Desperate Housewives (ABC)
- Joshua Gomez, Chuck (NBC)
- Mark Indelicato, Ugly Betty (ABC)
- George Lopez, Mr. Troop Mom (Nickelodeon)
- Tony Plana, Ugly Betty (ABC)
- James Roday, Psych (USA)
- Horatio Sanz, In the Motherhood (ABC)
- Charlie Sheen, Two and a Half Men (CBS)

=== Year in TV Comedy – Actress ===
- **Selena Gomez, Wizards of Waverly Place**
- Jessica Alba, The Office (NBC)
- Maria Canals-Barrera, Wizards of Waverly Place (Disney Channel)
- America Ferrera, Ugly Betty (ABC)
- Joanna Garcia, Privileged (CW)
- Salma Hayek, 30 Rock (NBC)
- Eva Longoria, Desperate Housewives (ABC)
- Lupe Ontiveros, Reaper (CW)
- Ana Ortiz, Ugly Betty (ABC)
- Judy Reyes, Scrubs (ABC)
- Rosie Perez, Lipstick Jungle (NBC)
- Jamie-Lynn Sigler, Entourage (HBO)
- Nadine Velazquez, My Name Is Earl (NBC)

=== Year in Music ===
- **David Archuleta**
- Christina Aguilera
- Black Eyed Peas
- Lynda Carter
- Kat DeLuna
- Enrique Iglesias
- Demi Lovato
- Maxwell
- Pitbull

=== Year in Film – Actor ===
- **John Leguizamo, Nothing Like the Holidays**
- Javier Bardem, Vicky Cristina Barcelona
- Clifton Collins Jr., Star Trek; Crank: High Voltage
- Luis Guzmán, The Taking of Pelham 123
- Cheech Marin, Race To Witch Mountain
- Alfred Molina, Pink Panther 2
- Oscar Nuñez, The Proposal
- Joaquin Phoenix, Two Lovers
- Efren Ramirez, Crank: High Voltage
- Freddy Rodriguez, Nothing Like the Holidays
- Ramon Rodriguez, Transformers: Revenge of The Fallen

=== Year in Film – Actress ===
- **Penélope Cruz, Vicky Cristina Barcelona**
- Rosario Dawson, Seven Pounds
- Cameron Diaz, My Sister's Keeper
- Eva Mendes, The Women; The Spirit
- Elizabeth Peña, Nothing Like the Holidays
- Michelle Rodriguez, Fast & Furious
- Zoe Saldaña, Star Trek
- Sofía Vergara, Madea Goes to Jail

=== Year in Documentaries ===
- **Latino Public Broadcasting (LPB)**

=== Year Behind the Scenes – Director ===
- **Alfredo De Villa - Nothing Like the Holidays**

=== Year Behind the Scenes – Writer ===
- **Rick Najera - Nothing Like the Holidays**

=== Year Behind the Scenes – Hair Stylist ===
- **Mary Ann Valdes - Twilight/Ugly Betty**

=== Year Behind the Scenes – Makeup ===
- **Jeanne Van Phue - Twilight**

=== Fashion Icon ===
- **Jessica Alba**

=== Anthony Quinn Award for Industry Excellence ===
- **Salma Hayek**

=== Special Achievement in Sports Television ===
- **Oscar De La Hoya**

=== The 2009 PepsiCo Adelante ALMA Award ===
- **Raul Yzaguirre**
