= The Great New Wonderful =

- Theatrical release poster
- Directed by: Danny Leiner
- Written by: Sam Catlin
- Produced by: Matt Tauber; Danny Leiner; Leslie Urdang; Amy Robinson
- Starring: Stephen Colbert; Olympia Dukakis; Jim Gaffigan; Judy Greer; Maggie Gyllenhaal; Naseeruddin Shah; Tom McCarthy; Tony Shalhoub; Edie Falco
- Music by: John Swihart
- Distributed by: First Independent Pictures
- Release dates: April 22, 2005 (Tribeca Film Festival); June 23, 2006 (United States)
- Running time: 88 minutes
- Country: United States
- Language: English
- Budget: $500,000
- Box office: $172,055

The Great New Wonderful is a 2005 American comedy-drama film written by Sam Catlin and directed by Danny Leiner. It stars Naseeruddin Shah, Tony Shalhoub, Jim Gaffigan, Sharat Saxena, Maggie Gyllenhaal and Olympia Dukakis, and tells the tales of several New Yorkers a year after the September 11, 2001 terrorist attacks. The film premiered on April 22, 2005 at the Tribeca Film Festival and was released in the United States on June 26, 2006.

== Plot ==
The Great New Wonderful is a series of vignettes of incidents taking place concurrently around Manhattan. The only other thing linking the incidents is the month in which they occur: September 2002. Recurring themes include frustration and sugar.

The vignettes include:

- An accountant (Jim Gaffigan) undergoing a therapy session in the office of a passive-aggressive psychologist (Tony Shalhoub).
- Two immigrants from India, Avi and Satish (Naseeruddin Shah and Sharat Saxena), on security detail for a visiting dignitary.
- An ambitious pastry chef (Maggie Gyllenhaal) preparing a professional pitch that she hopes will make her the reigning doyenne of New York's competitive cake scene.
- A Brooklyn housewife (Olympia Dukakis) fixes her husband's dinner and then sits at the kitchen table making collages out of old magazines while her husband sits on the balcony, smoking a cigarette.
- Allison and David Burbage (Judy Greer and Tom McCarthy) struggle to keep their marriage together while coping with their increasingly difficult and strangely self-possessed 10-year-old son.

== Cast ==
- Olympia Dukakis as Judy Hillerman
- Jim Gaffigan as Sandie
- Judy Greer as Allison Burbage
- Maggie Gyllenhaal as Emme Keeler
- Tom McCarthy as David Burbage
- Sharat Saxena as Satish
- Naseeruddin Shah as Avi
- Tony Shalhoub as Dr. Trabulous
- Edie Falco as Safarah Polsky
- Stephen Colbert as Mr. Peersall
- Jim Parsons as Justin
- Seth Gilliam as Clayton
- Will Arnett as Danny Keeler
- Tony Kushner as Himself
- Ari Graynor as Lisa Krindel
- Julie Dretzin as Julie Driscoll
- Rosemarie DeWitt as Debbie
- Tonye Patano as Shirley
- Alex McCord as Jessilyn
- Dick Latessa as Jerry Binder
- Sam Catlin as Councilman Blenick
- Marilyn Chris as Phyllis
- Anita Gillette as Lainie
- David Costabile as Vending Machine Guy
- Meredith Ostrom as Anita
- Fred Burrell as Wexler Whitehead

== Reception ==
On review aggregator Rotten Tomatoes, the film has an approval rating of 73% based on 41 reviews, and an average rating of 6.7/10. The website's critical consensus reads, "Set in post-9/11 New York, this largely evocative dramedy interweaves the stories of five disconnected individuals who share an unspoken emotional malaise that shadows their attempts at returning to normal life." On Metacritic, the film has a weighted average score of 57 out of 100, based on 14 critics, indicating "mixed or average reviews".
