= Topaz Page-Green =

South African model

Topaz Page-Green is a fashion model and the founder and president of the non-profit corporation The Lunchbox Fund.

== Early life and education ==
Topaz Page-Green was born in 1979 and raised near Johannesburg, South Africa. Her father and mother were geologists.

She attended Kingsmead College, an all-girls private school in Johannesburg.

== Career ==
After graduating from high school, Page-Green began her career in modelling after moving to London. While travelling on London's Underground she was noticed by a model scout and signed soon after with a talent agency. On a trip home to South Africa in 2003 she was confronted with the extreme poverty of her country, and decided to do something about it. In 2005, she launched The Lunchbox Fund as her response to this poverty. The fund raises money to provide one meal a day to poor and at-risk students in township high schools in South Africa.

She studied Africa, sociology, and human rights at the New York University’s Gallatin School of Individualized Study.

== The Lunchbox Fund ==
Page-Green founded The Lunchbox Fund in 2005. The fund provides one meal each day to 22,000 underprivileged high school students, totaling more than 2.6 million meals a year. The Lunchbox Fund began in the historically at-risk Soweto district of Johannesburg.

== Feedie ==
Page-Green created Feedie, an app which is credited as being the “first philanthropic food app.” Designed to be used by ‘foodies’ and others, the Feedie application uses social media to transform people's passion for sharing their photos of food into the sharing of actual food with school children in need via The Lunchbox Fund.

== Recognition ==
In September 2015 fashion designer Kenneth Cole included Page-Green in his “Courageous Class” ad campaign re-affirming his brand's motto, “Look Good, For Good.”

Forbes included Topaz Page-Green in their list of the “World’s Most Powerful Business Women” in 2015.

== Personal life and style ==
Page-Green lives in an apartment in New York City's East Village. She has lived in New York since 2001. Page-Green is a vegetarian, and eats “mostly vegan” food. She was in a relationship with actor Joaquin Phoenix from 2001 to 2005.

Page-Green has a son with her partner Emmanuel Roman.
