= The Lunchbox Fund =

Non-profit organization

The Lunchbox Fund is a non-profit organization providing a daily meal for orphaned and vulnerable school children in township and rural areas of South Africa. The organization was founded by South African model Topaz Page-Green.

The Board of Directors include Joaquin Phoenix and Rain Phoenix. Salman Rushdie, Balthazar Getty, Francois Pienaar, Felicia Mabuza-Suttle and Hugh Masekela serve on the advisory board. A number of ambassadors and local volunteers work full- and part-time with the fund in South Africa.

== Organization ==
Often their only guaranteed meal of a day, the meals are delivered at school. It encourages children to stay in school, attend more frequently, and obtain their education. When a child stays in school, his or her risk of HIV infection, abuse and unwanted pregnancies is greatly reduced. Twelve million South African children need feeding. The government feeding program reaches 8 million. The Lunchbox Fund's aim is to feed the rest.

- 65% of South African children live below the poverty line
- 19.6% of South African children are orphans, mainly as a result of the HIV/AIDS epidemic
- Unemployment is a severe problem
- Parents and caregivers are unable to feed their children or provide access to basic health care
- Hunger diminishes concentration and erodes willpower, stripping away the potential greatness of a child
- $0.25/R2.50 feeds one child one meal for one day

The Lunchbox Fund identifies schools, or forms partnerships with locally based, in-community NGOs or community organizations in order to identify and evaluate schools. They then fund distributors or the Community Partner to buy and deliver food, monitor the feeding scheme, implement a Project Manager and deliver reports to the Fund. This allows for a sustained Lunchbox Fund community presence and constant ‘in situ’ evaluation. The Fund's principals pay quarterly site visits to all schools involved in the Feeding Program.

== Fundraising ==
Every year The Fund hosts a Live Auction Fundraising Event to raise the organisation's core-operating funds. By covering these costs in their totality, 100% of any donations, funding or grants made to The Lunchbox fund - translate directly into meals for school children.

Fundraising Events have included:

2013: The Lunchbox Fund's Fall Fête and Feedie Launch co-chaired by Maggie Gyllenhaal, Liv Tyler and Mario Batali featured a music performance by Grammy Nominated Emily King, as well as an auction of artwork created for the evening by notable artists including Chuck Close, Tara Donovan, Donald Baechler, Jim Dine, Michael Stipe, Shepard Fairey, Curtis Kulig, Dustin Yellin, Oliver Clegg, Mick Rock, Lou Reed, Bob Gruen, Alan Cumming, Tim Furzer, Martin Puryear, Isca Greenfield Sanders, Danny Clinch, Harif Guzman, Gianfranco Gorgoni, James Sienna, Kiki Smith, and more. The auction broke the Charity's record to date.

2012: The Lunchbox Fund Bookfair. One of a kind handmade art books created by Sir Ben Kingsley, Chuck Close, Deepak Chopra, Archbishop Desmond Tutu with South African artist Paul Du Toit, Hugh Masekela, Mario Batali with Jim Dine, Tony Bennett and Kelsey Bennett, rock photographer Bob Gruen with Yoko Ono, Michael Stipe, Philip Glass, Salman Rushdie with Francisco Clemente, Mick Rock, Shepard Fairey, and Sting.

2005 - 2011: The Lunchbox Auctions featured lunchboxes designed and decorated by prominent people like: designed by Bill Clinton, Yoko Ono, Liv Tyler, Cameron Diaz, Flea of Red Hot Chili Peppers, Michael Stipe, David Bowie, Beastie Boys, Rachael Ray, Anna Sui, Patti Smith, Josh Hartnett, Mike Myers, Jimmy Kimmel, Hilary Swank, John Mayer, Jimmy Fallon, Jeff Bridges, Iman, Kanye West, Beyoncé, Bono, The Edge, Maggie Gyllenhaal, Peter Sarsgaard, Reese Witherspoon, Naomi Campbell, Joaquin Phoenix, Alice Temperley, Diane von Fürstenberg, Zac Posen, Billy Crudup, Marchesa, Mario Batali, Eva Mendes, Elliot Page, Pete Yorn, Bill Gates, Casey Affleck, Natalie Portman, Orlando Bloom, Tom Colicchio, Alber Elbaz, Tony Bennett, Emeril, James Franco, Helena Christensen, Sean Combs, Charlize Theron, Kate Spade, Lisa Marie Presley, and Sarah Silverman.

=== Royal baby gifts ===
The Lunchbox Fund is one of the four charities to which the Duke and Duchess of Sussex suggested people might donate instead of sending gifts for their newborn son Archie in 2019.
