= 6th Youth in Film Awards =

1984 US media awards ceremony

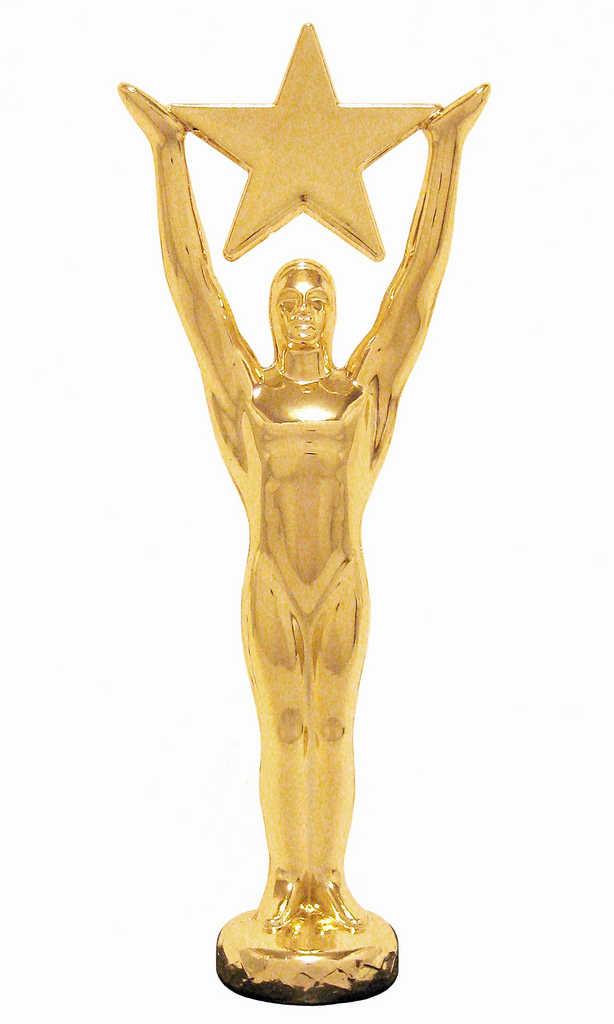
- Awarded for: Achievement in the 1983—1984 season
- Date: December 2, 1984
- Site: Hollywood, California
- Hosted by: Anthony Michael Hall

The 6th Youth in Film Awards ceremony (now known as the Young Artist Awards), presented by the Youth in Film Association, honored outstanding youth performers under the age of 21 in the fields of film, television and dance for the 1983–1984 season, and took place on December 2, 1984, in Hollywood, California.

Established in 1978 by long-standing Hollywood Foreign Press Association member, Maureen Dragone, the Youth in Film Association was the first organization to establish an awards ceremony specifically set to recognize and award the contributions of performers under the age of 18 in the fields of film, television, theater and music.

== Categories ==
★ Bold indicates the winner in each category.

== Best Young Performer in a Motion Picture ==
=== Best Young Actor in a Motion Picture: Musical, Comedy, Adventure or Drama ===
★ Noah Hathaway – The NeverEnding Story (Warner Bros)

- Peter Billingsley – A Christmas Story (MGM/UA)
- Anthony Michael Hall – Sixteen Candles (Universal)
- Ross Harris – Testament (Paramount)
- Byron Thames – Heart Like a Wheel (20th Century Fox)
- Jason Presson – The Stone Boy (TLC Films/20th Century Fox)
- Barret Oliver – The NeverEnding Story (Warner Bros)
- Henry Thomas – Cloak & Dagger (Universal)

=== Best Young Actress in a Motion Picture: Musical, Comedy, Adventure or Drama ===
★ Molly Ringwald – Sixteen Candles (Universal)

- Drew Barrymore – Irreconcilable Differences (Warner Bros)
- Alison Eastwood – Tightrope (Warner Bros)
- Christina Nigra – Cloak & Dagger (Universal)
- Roxana Zal – Testament (Paramount)

=== Best Young Supporting Actor in a Motion Picture, Musical, Comedy, Adventure or Drama ===
★ Ke Huy Quan – Indiana Jones and the Temple of Doom (Paramount)

- Corey Feldman – Gremlins (Warner Bros)
- Huckleberry Fox – Misunderstood (MGM/UA)
- Chris Hebert – The Last Starfighter (Lorimar)
- Damon Hines – The Adventures of Buckaroo Banzai Across the 8th Dimension (20th Century Fox)
- Robby Kiger – Children of the Corn (Gatlin Productions)
- Ian Petrella – A Christmas Story (MGM/UA)
- Brad Savage – Red Dawn (MGM/UA)
- Billy Zabka – The Karate Kid (Columbia)

=== Best Young Supporting Actress in a Motion Picture, Musical, Comedy, Adventure or Drama ===
★ Elisabeth Shue – The Karate Kid (Columbia)

- Therese Graham – Country (Disney)
- Gennie James – Places in the Heart (Tri-Star)
- Anne Marie McEvoy – Children of the Corn (Gatlin Productions)
- Sarah Jessica Parker – Footloose (Paramount)
- Tami Stronach – The NeverEnding Story (Warner Bros)

== Best Young Performer in a Family Film Made for Television ==
=== Best Young Actor in a Family Film Made for Television ===
★ Doug Scott – The Day After (ABC)

- Shane Conrad – Hard Knox (NBC)
- Timothy Gibbs – CBS Schoolbreak Special – Dead Wrong (CBS)
- Leaf and River Phoenix – ABC Afterschool Special – Backwards: The Riddle of Dyslexia (ABC)
- Jerry Supiran – Policewoman Centerfold (Orion-TV)

=== Best Young Actress in a Family Film Made for Television ===
★ Missy Francis – Something About Amelia (ABC)

- Amanita Hyldahl – The Winter of Our Discontent (CBS)
- Jill Schoelen – Happy Endings (NBC)
- Cheryl Arutt – NBC Special Treat – Bobby and Sarah (NBC)
- Claudia Wells – Anatomy of an Illness (CBS)

== Best Young Performer in a Television Drama Series ==
=== Best Young Actor in a Daytime or Nighttime Television Series ===
★ David Mendenhall – General Hospital (ABC)

- Brian Bloom – As the World Turns (CBS)
- Danny Ponce – Knots Landing (CBS)
- Damian Scheller – Guiding Light (CBS)
- Trevor Richard – Another World (NBC)
- Omri Katz – Dallas (CBS)

=== Best Young Actress in a Daytime or Nighttime Television Series ===
★ Shalane McCall – Dallas (CBS)

- Melissa Brennan – Santa Barbara (NBC)
- Kristian Alfonso – Days of Our Lives (NBC)
- Dana Kimmell – Days of Our Lives (NBC)
- Lisa Trusel – Days of Our Lives (NBC)

=== Best Young Supporting Actor in a Daytime or Nighttime Drama ===
★ David Hollander – Call to Glory (ABC)

- Gabriel Damon – Call to Glory (ABC)
- Bobby Jacoby – Knots Landing (CBS)
- Kirk Cameron – Two Marriages (ABC)
- Paul Stout – Scarecrow and Mrs. King (CBS)
- Todd McKee – Santa Barbara (NBC)

=== Best Young Supporting Actress in a Daytime or Nighttime Drama ===
★ Melora Hardin – Two Marriages (ABC)

- Michelle Bennett – The Yellow Rose (NBC)
- Tonya Crowe – Knots Landing (CBS)
- Andrea Barber – Days of Our Lives (NBC)
- Julie Anne Haddock – Boone (NBC)
- Amanda Peterson – Boone (NBC)

== Best Young Performer in a Television Comedy Series ==
=== Best Young Actor in a Television Comedy Series ===
★ Billy Jacoby – It's Not Easy (ABC)

- Jason Bateman – It's Your Move (NBC)
- Emmanuel Lewis – Webster (ABC)
- Alfonso Ribeiro – Silver Spoons (NBC)
- John Stamos – Dreams (CBS)

=== Best Young Actress in a Television Comedy Series ===
★ Justine Bateman – Family Ties (NBC)

- Kim Fields – The Facts of Life (NBC)
- Soleil Moon Frye – Punky Brewster (NBC)
- Lauri Hendler – Gimme a Break! (NBC)
- Laura Jacoby – Mr. Smith (NBC)
- Ari Meyers – Kate & Allie (CBS)
- Jill Whelan – The Love Boat (ABC)

=== Best Young Supporting Actor in a Television Comedy Series ===
★ (tie) Corky Pigeon – Silver Spoons (NBC)
★ (tie) Malcolm-Jamal Warner – The Cosby Show (NBC)

- Danny Cooksey – Diff'rent Strokes (NBC)
- Frederick Koehler – Kate & Allie (CBS)
- Joey Lawrence – Gimme a Break! (NBC)

=== Best Young Supporting Actress in a Television Comedy Series ===
★ Tina Yothers – Family Ties (NBC)

- Tempestt Bledsoe – The Cosby Show (NBC)
- Lisa Bonet – The Cosby Show (NBC)
- Missy Gold – Benson (ABC)
- Lara Jill Miller – Gimme a Break! (NBC)
- Keshia Knight Pulliam – The Cosby Show (NBC)

== Best Young Performer in a Cable Series or Program ==
=== Best Young Actor/Actress in a Cable Series or Program ===
★ Priscilla Weems – Five Mile Creek (Disney Channel)

- Randy Josselyn – Down to Earth (TBS Superstation)
- Aaron Lohr – Let's Hear It for the Boy (Deniece Williams music video)
- Kyle Richards – Down to Earth (TBS Superstation)

== Best Young Performer: Guest in a Series ==
=== Best Young Actor: Guest in a Series ===
★ Taliesin Jaffe – The Facts of Life (NBC)

- David Faustino – The Love Boat (ABC)
- David Friedman – Mama's Family (NBC)
- Chad Allen – Airwolf (CBS)
- Barret Oliver – Highway to Heaven (NBC)
- John Louie – Riptide (ABC)
- Bumper Robinson – Matt Houston (ABC)
- R. J. Williams – Magnum, P.I. (CBS)
- Jaleel White – The Jeffersons (CBS)
- Eric Johnson – V (NBC)

=== Best Young Actress: Guest in a Series ===
★ Heather O'Rourke – Webster (ABC)

- Angela Lee – The Master (NBC)
- Christa Denton – Silver Spoons (NBC)
- Shannen Doherty – Airwolf (CBS)
- Natalie Klinger – One Day at a Time (CBS)
- Tanya Fenmore – Mama's Family (NBC)
- Sydney Penny – Silver Spoons (NBC)
- Robyn Lively – Knight Rider (NBC)
- Bridgette Andersen – The Mississippi (CBS)
- Kim Richards – The Mississippi (CBS)

== Best Family Entertainment ==
=== Best Family Film Made for Television ===
★ Something About Amelia (ABC)

- ABC Afterschool Special – Backwards: The Riddle of Dyslexia (ABC)
- CBS Schoolbreak Special – Welcome Home, Jellybean (CBS)
- CBS Schoolbreak Special – Dead Wrong (CBS)
- ABC Afterschool Special – Summer Switch (ABC)

=== Best New Comedy or Drama Television Series ===
★ The Cosby Show (NBC)

- Call to Glory (ABC)
- Charles in Charge (CBS)
- Who's the Boss? (ABC)
- Highway to Heaven (NBC)
- It's Your Move (NBC)
- Kate & Allie (CBS)
- Punky Brewster (NBC)

=== Best Family Motion Picture – Musical or Comedy ===
★ Ghostbusters (Columbia)

- Breakin' (Cannon)
- A Christmas Story (MGM/UA)
- Footloose (Paramount)
- Splash (Disney)
- The Muppets Take Manhattan (Tri Star)

=== Best Family Motion Picture – Adventure ===
★ Gremlins (Warner Bros.)

- Cloak & Dagger (Universal)
- The NeverEnding Story (Warner Bros.)
- The Adventures of Buckaroo Banzai Across the 8th Dimension (20th Century Fox)
- Space Raiders (New World)
- The Stone Boy (TLC Films)

=== Best Family Motion Picture – Drama ===
★ The Karate Kid (Columbia)

- The Right Stuff (The Ladd Co.)
- Heart Like a Wheel (20th Century Fox)
- Running Brave (Disney)
- Tank (Universal)

== Youth In Film's Special Awards ==
=== Former Child Star Award ===
★ Jerry Mathers – Leave It to Beaver

=== The Jackie Coogan Award ===
==== Outstanding Contribution to Youth Through Motion Pictures ====
★ The Wizard of Oz – MGM

=== Youth In Film's Theater Arts Award ===
★ Tina and Dennis Caspary (Dance team)

=== The Michael Landon Award ===
==== Outstanding Contribution to Youth Through Television ====
★ Martin Tahse (Producer of various After School Specials)

=== Best Young Actor in a Foreign Film ===
★ Martin Lewis – Five Mile Creek (Australia)

=== Best Young Actress in a Foreign Film ===
★ Nina Knapskog – Kamilla (Norway) – Produced by Vibeke Lakkeberg

=== Best Foreign Film ===
★ The Gods Must Be Crazy (South Africa) – Released by 20TH Century Fox Film Co.
