= Fred Burrell (actor) =

American actor (1936–2018)

- Born: September 18, 1936; Cedar Rapids, Iowa, US
- Died: April 9, 2018 (aged 81); Madison, Indiana, US
- Occupation: Actor
- Years active: 1960–2007
- Television: Law & Order

Frederick William Burrell (September 18, 1936 – April 9, 2018) was an American actor.

== Biography ==
Born September 18, 1936, in Cedar Rapids, Iowa, he was the son of Max W. and Harriett M. (Doty) Burrell.

Fred completed high school in Cedar Rapids and earned a bachelor's degree in American history from the University of North Carolina at Chapel Hill. After graduation, he left the United States to study acting at the Royal London Academy of Music and Dramatic Art, returning to New York City in 1960.

He pursued a professional acting career, performing in Broadway and off-Broadway productions such as Judgment at Nuremberg, Inherit the Wind, Never Too Late, Illya Darling, The Pajama Game and Memorandum; appearing in films including Klute, Kinsey, and We Own the Night; and working in television on shows such as Law & Order.

Fred was a member of the Holy Trinity Episcopal Church, where he had previously served as business manager, vestry member, and staff member before retiring in 2001. He was also affiliated with the Episcopal Actors’ Guild of America, Screen Actors Guild, and Actors' Equity Association.

== Filmography ==
=== Film ===
Fred Burrell' film credits
Year	Title	Role	Notes
1971	Klute	Man in Hotel	
1974	Shoot It Black, Shoot It Blue	Teacher	
1982	Hit and Run	School Principal	
2004	Kinsey	IU Reporter No. 2	
2005	The Great New Wonderful	Wexler Whitehead	
2007	We Own the Night	NYPD Commissioner Patrick Ruddy	

=== Television ===
Paul Herman's television credits
Year	Title	Role	Notes
1965–1965	Inherit the Wind	Davenport	
1971–1971	Dr. Cook's Garden	Harry Bullitt	
1966–1966	Flipper	Dr. Osborne	1 episode
1985–1985	Rockhopper	Bill Larabee	1 episode
2003–2003	Law & Order: Special Victims Unit	Judge Howie Rebard	1 episode
1993–2005	Law & Order	Arthur Rigg, Bill Wilson, Dr. Brackley, Phil Lamar, Ross McMillan	5 episodes
