= Joaquin Phoenix =

American actor (born 1974)

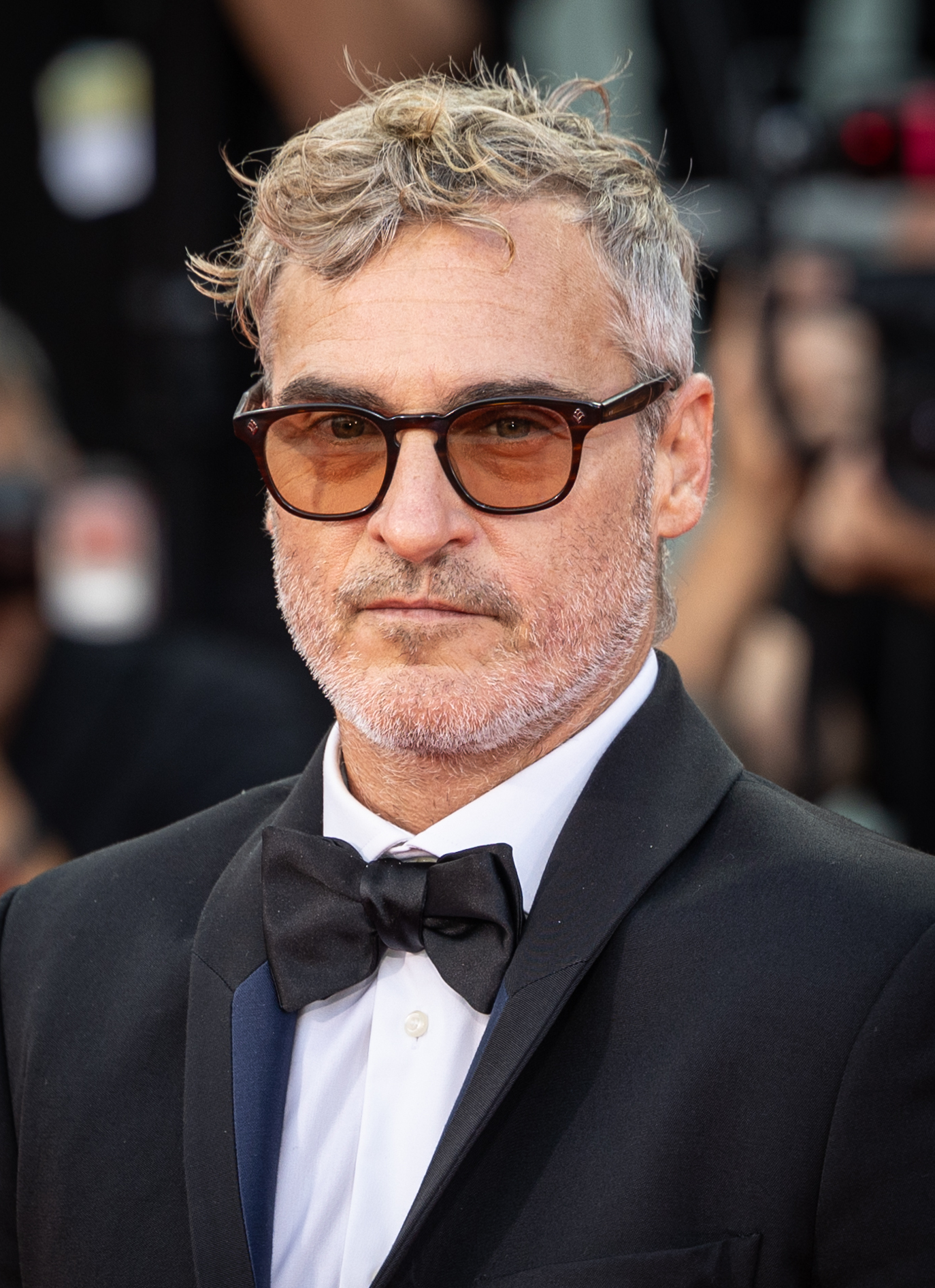
- Phoenix in 2024
- Born: Joaquín Rafael Bottom; October 28, 1974 (age 52); San Juan, Puerto Rico
- Other name: Leaf Phoenix
- Occupation: Actor
- Years active: 1982–present
- Works: Filmography
- Spouse: Rooney Mara
- Children: 2
- Mother: Arlyn Phoenix
- Relatives: River Phoenix (brother); Rain Phoenix (sister); Liberty Phoenix (sister); Summer Phoenix (sister)
- Awards: Full list

Joaquin Rafael Phoenix (Note: In his childhood, he went by Leaf Rafael Phoenix. At age fifteen, he changed back to his given name "Joaquin Rafael Phoenix".) (/hwɑːˈkiːn/ whah-KEEN; né Bottom; October 28, 1974) is an American actor. Widely described as one of the preeminent actors of his generation and known for his roles as dark, unconventional and eccentric characters in independent film, he has received various accolades, including an Academy Award, an Actor Award, a BAFTA Award, a Grammy Award, a Volpi Cup, and two Golden Globes.

Phoenix began his career by appearing in television series in the early 1980s with his brother River. His first major film roles were in SpaceCamp (1986) and Parenthood (1989). During this period, he was credited as Leaf Phoenix, a name he gave himself. He took back his birth name in the early 1990s and received critical acclaim for his supporting roles in To Die For (1995) and Quills (2000). Phoenix received further critical acclaim and a nomination for the Academy Award for Best Supporting Actor for his portrayal of Commodus in the historical drama Gladiator (2000). He had success with the horror films Signs (2002) and The Village (2004), the historical drama Hotel Rwanda (2004), and won a Grammy Award, a Golden Globe Award, and a nomination for the Academy Award for Best Actor for his portrayal of musician Johnny Cash in the biopic Walk the Line (2005).

Following a brief sabbatical, Phoenix starred in the psychological drama The Master (2012), winning the Volpi Cup for Best Actor and earning his third Academy Award nomination. He gained praise for his roles in the romantic drama Her (2013) and the crime satire Inherent Vice (2014), and won the Cannes Film Festival Award for Best Actor for the psychological thriller You Were Never Really Here (2017). For his performance as the titular character of Joker (2019), Phoenix won the Academy Award for Best Actor. He reprised his role in the 2024 sequel Joker: Folie à Deux. He has since starred in the independent films C'mon C'mon (2021), Beau Is Afraid (2023) and Eddington (2025), and portrayed the title role in the historical drama Napoleon (2023).

Outside acting, Phoenix is an animal rights activist. A vegan, he regularly supports charitable causes and has produced several documentaries on global meat consumption and its impact on the environment.

== Early life ==
Joaquin Rafael Bottom was born on October 28, 1974, at the Hospital Metropolitano San Francisco in Río Piedras, San Juan, Puerto Rico, to Arlyn Sharon "Heart" (née Dunetz), an executive secretary at NBC whose connection to an agent provided her children with acting work, and John Lee Bottom, the founder of a landscape gardening company. He is the middle child of five, following River and Rain, and preceding Liberty and Summer, all of whom have been involved in acting. They also have an older paternal half-sister, Jodean. Their father was a Catholic from Fontana, California, and was of English, German and French ancestry. Bottom's maternal grandparents were Ashkenazi Jews originally from Hungary and Russia.

Soon after Rain was born, Bottom's parents joined the religious cult Children of God, traveling as missionaries throughout the Caribbean and South America, where he and Liberty were born. They eventually became disillusioned with the cult and left in 1977, being opposed to the latter's increasingly questionable rules, particularly the practice of flirty fishing. The family then settled in Florida, where Summer was born; around this time, they legally adopted the surname Phoenix, inspired by the mythical bird that rises from its own ashes, symbolizing a new beginning. When he was three, Joaquin Phoenix and his older siblings witnessed fish being stunned as "they were throwing them against the side of the boat", prompting the whole family to convert to a vegan lifestyle.

== Career ==
=== 1980–1993: Early work and family tragedy ===
In 1979, when Phoenix's father had to stop working because of an old spinal injury, the family moved to Los Angeles where the mother met a high-profile child agent named Iris Burton, who got the children into commercials and bit parts on TV. Phoenix made his acting debut alongside his brother in the television series Seven Brides for Seven Brothers in the 1982 episode "Christmas Song". He has said of his first acting experience:

Instantaneous joy. The most enjoyable thing. For some kids, it's the first time they crack a ball or score a goal. For me, it was this. I was eight years old, and I remember the first scene on the TV set so vividly. And I knew that I loved it – the physical sensation; how powerful it was. That's the feeling I've been chasing ever since.

In 1984, Phoenix starred opposite his brother River in the ABC Afterschool Special entitled Backwards: The Riddle of Dyslexia, for which they shared a nomination for Best Young Actor in a Family Film Made for Television at the 6th Youth in Film Awards. He also made guest appearances in the Murder, She Wrote episode "We're Off to Kill the Wizard", and individual episodes of The Fall Guy and Hill Street Blues. A year later, he appeared in the television film Kids Don't Tell. To supplement their income, the kids sang their original songs like "Gonna Make It", written by River, and busked for money in matching yellow shirts and shorts. They also studied dance; Phoenix became an avid breakdancer. He dropped out of high school when he was sent a dead frog in the mail to dissect for his biology studies. Dissatisfied with life in Los Angeles, the Phoenixes moved back to Florida, settling in Gainesville.

Phoenix made his feature film debut in the adventure film SpaceCamp (1986) as a young boy who goes to Kennedy Space Center to learn about the NASA space program and undergoes amateur astronaut training. He guest-starred in the anthology series Alfred Hitchcock Presents episode "A Very Happy Ending" that year, playing a child who blackmails a hitman into killing his father. Phoenix's first starring role was in the film Russkies (1987), about a group of friends who unknowingly befriend a Russian soldier during the Cold War.

In 1989, Phoenix co-starred as Garry, the withdrawn teenage nephew of Steve Martin's character in Ron Howard's comedy-drama Parenthood. It was a box office success, grossing $126 million worldwide against its $20 million budget. Critics praised the film, with IndieWire reviewers highlighting the film's cast and their performances for possessing "genuinely likable, and occasionally insightful, heart" calling Phoenix a "terrifically believable angsty adolescent", in a performance that garnered him a nomination for the Young Artist Award for Best Leading Young Actor in a Feature Film. The role of Garry was reprised in the series based on the film by Leonardo DiCaprio, who studied Phoenix's performance "to get it right". After establishing himself as a child actor, Phoenix felt he was not getting any appealing offers (he got typecast playing similar roles he did in Parenthood); he decided to take a break from acting and traveled to Mexico with his father, learning Spanish. When he returned to the States, his brother River suggested that Phoenix change his name back to Joaquin and encouraged him to start acting again.

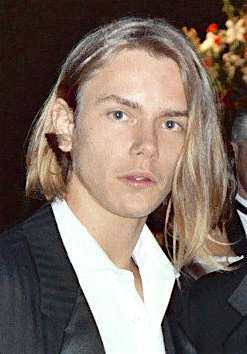
Phoenix's older brother River Phoenix, who died in 1993, convinced Phoenix to return to acting.

On October 31, 1993, River died of a drug overdose outside The Viper Room in West Hollywood. Phoenix, who had accompanied his brother and older sister Rain to the club, called 911 to seek help for his dying brother. After the death, the phone call was repeatedly broadcast on TV and radio shows. The family retreated to Costa Rica to escape the media glare as the event came to be depicted as a cautionary tale of young Hollywood surrounded by mythology and conspiracy.

=== 1994–1999: Return to acting ===
Phoenix returned to acting in Gus Van Sant's 1995 black comedy To Die For, based on the novel of the same name by Joyce Maynard, which in turn was inspired by the Pamela Smart murder case. Phoenix starred as Jimmy Emmett, a disturbed young man who is seduced by a woman (Nicole Kidman) to commit murder. The film premiered at the 1995 Cannes Film Festival and became a financial and critical success, with New York Times critic Janet Maslin praising Phoenix's performance, writing "So pity poor Jimmy. Rivetingly played by Mr Phoenix with a raw, anguished expressiveness that makes him an actor to watch for, Jimmy is both tempted and terrified by Suzanne's slick amorality. In that, he speaks for us all."

In 1997, Phoenix played a small-town troublemaker in Oliver Stone's U Turn, and a poor man in love with a rich woman in Inventing the Abbotts. The films were received with mostly mixed and negative reviews, respectively, and neither performed well at the box office. The following year, Phoenix starred in Clay Pigeons as a young man in a small town who befriends a serial killer. The film was released to a dismal box office performance, but it was well received by critics. In his next film, 8mm (1999), Phoenix co-starred as an adult video store employee who helps Tom Welles (Nicolas Cage) investigate the underworld of illegal pornography. The film turned out to be a box office success, grossing $96 million worldwide, but found few admirers among critics.

=== 2000–2010: Critical acclaim and commercial success ===
Phoenix attending an event for The Yards at the 2000 Cannes Film Festival

In 2000, Phoenix co-starred in three films. In the first of these, he portrayed a fictionalized version of Roman Emperor Commodus in Ridley Scott's historical epic film Gladiator. The film received positive reviews and grossed $457 million worldwide, making it the second highest-grossing film of 2000. Chris Nashawaty of Entertainment Weekly called Phoenix's work "a more nuanced star-making performance" when comparing him to the lead Russell Crowe, writing "Phoenix turns what could have easily been a cartoonish villain into a richly layered study of pathology." Phoenix earned his first nominations for an Academy Award, a Golden Globe Award and a BAFTA Award in the Best Supporting Actor category. He and his late brother River became the first brothers to be nominated for acting Academy Awards. To this date, they are the only brothers to hold this distinction.

His next film marked his first collaboration with director James Gray in The Yards. The crime film follows the corruption in the rail yards of Queens. Although failing to perform well at the box office, The Yards received positive reviews from critics with many considering Phoenix's performance as the villain a stand out. The third release of 2000 was Philip Kaufman's Quills, a satirical thriller inspired by the life and work of the Marquis de Sade. Phoenix portrayed the conflicted priest Abbé de Coulmier opposite Kate Winslet. The film premiered at the Telluride Film Festival and was a modest art house success grossing a total of $17 million at the box office. It was received with critical praise with Peter Travers of Rolling Stone praising Phoenix and his chemistry with Winslet, stating "Phoenix, on a roll this year with Gladiator and The Yards, excels at making the priest a seductive figure—a neat trick considering the real Abbe was a four-foot hunchback. Winslet and Phoenix generate real fire, notably when Abbe dreams of ravishing Madeleine on the altar." For his combined roles of that year, Phoenix was awarded the Broadcast Film Critics Association Award for Best Supporting Actor and the National Board of Review Award for Best Supporting Actor.

The following year, Phoenix starred in the satirical film Buffalo Soldiers as a U.S. Army soldier. The world premiere was held at the 2001 Toronto International Film Festival in early September. However, because the film was a satire of the US military, its wider theatrical run was delayed by approximately two years because of the September 11 attacks; it was finally released on July 25, 2003. BBC's Nev Pierce wrote that "Phoenix is excellent as a Gen X Sergeant Bilko, ensuring his cheerfully amoral character never loses heart—showcasing tenderness, love, grief and fear as his games get out of control" and Phoenix received a nomination for the British Independent Film Award for Best Actor.

The science fiction thriller Signs (2002) marked Phoenix's first collaboration with director M. Night Shyamalan. In the film, he played Merrill Hess, a former Minor League Baseball player who, along with his older brother Graham (Mel Gibson), discovers that Earth has been invaded by extraterrestrials. The film received mixed reviews from critics, but Phoenix's performance was praised, with critic Peter Travers writing that Phoenix "registers impressively, finding the humor and the pain in this lost boy [...] never making a false move as a helpless Merrill watches his rock of a brother crumble into a despairing crisis of faith." The film was a commercial success, grossing $408.2 million worldwide.

In 2003, Phoenix played the irresolute husband of a superstar-skater (Claire Danes) in Thomas Vinterberg's romance-drama It's All About Love, and voiced Kenai in the Disney animated film Brother Bear. Phoenix expressed immense joy being cast as the lead voice role in a Disney animated feature, stating "The real pinnacle [in my career] is that I'm playing an animated character in a Disney film. Isn't that the greatest?" The film grossed $250.4 million worldwide, and was nominated for the Academy Award for Best Animated Feature. He was replaced by Patrick Dempsey in the sequel Brother Bear 2. Phoenix reunited with Shyamalan in the period thriller The Village (2004). The film is about a village whose population lives in fear of creatures inhabiting the woods beyond it, referred to as "Those We Don't Speak Of". He played farmer Lucius Hunt, a role which Christopher Orr of The Atlantic found "underdeveloped". Though initially receiving mixed reviews, the film attracted retrospective reviews years after its release. Several critics deemed it one of Shyamalan's best films, praising Phoenix's "terrific" performance. The film was a financial success, grossing $256.7 million worldwide on its $60 million budget.

In his next film of the year, he starred opposite John Travolta in the drama film Ladder 49 as a Baltimore firefighter. In preparation for the role, Phoenix trained for two months with the Baltimore Fire Department, putting out actual fires. He admitted that he was afraid of heights before he started making this film, recalling "I got to the pole and I looked down and I couldn't do it. But you go through the training and it exposes your fears and helps you to overcome them. We ended up rappelling off a six-story tower and that really helped." The film earned $102.3 million at the box office despite receiving generally mixed reviews. Roger Ebert gave the film 3.5 out of 4 stars, praising the performances in the film. Phoenix's final film of 2004 was Terry George's Hotel Rwanda, playing cameraman Jack Daglish. Based on the Rwandan genocide, the film documents Paul Rusesabagina's (Don Cheadle) efforts to save the lives of his family and more than 1,000 other refugees by providing them with shelter in the besieged Hôtel des Mille Collines. The film was a moderate financial success but was a critical success, receiving almost exclusively positive reviews from critics. For his performance in the film, Phoenix was nominated for a Screen Actors Guild Award along with the cast.

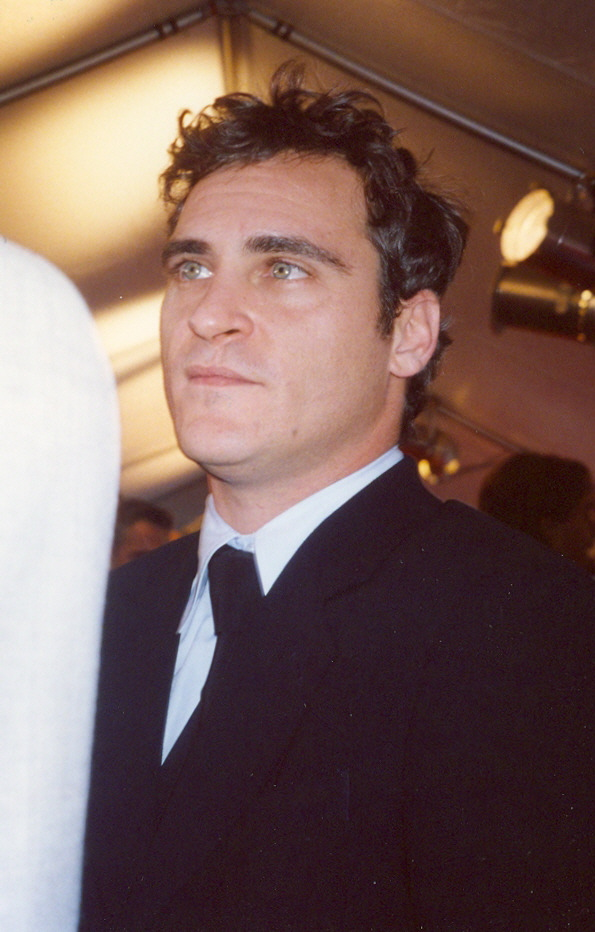
Phoenix attending the premiere of Walk the Line at the 2005 Toronto International Film Festival

In 2005, Phoenix co-starred alongside Reese Witherspoon in the James Mangold directed film Walk the Line, a Johnny Cash biopic, after Cash himself approved of Phoenix. All of Cash's vocal tracks in the film and on the accompanying soundtrack are played and sung by Phoenix. The film premiered at the Telluride Film Festival, eventually grossing $186 million worldwide. Phoenix's performance received rave reviews from critics and it inspired film critic Roger Ebert to write, "Knowing Johnny Cash's albums more or less by heart, I closed my eyes to focus on the soundtrack and decided that, yes, that was the voice of Johnny Cash I was listening to. The closing credits make it clear it's Joaquin Phoenix doing the singing, and I was gob-smacked". For his portrayal of Johnny Cash, he won the Golden Globe Award for Best Actor – Motion Picture Musical or Comedy and the Grammy Award for Best Compilation Soundtrack for Visual Media for the film's soundtrack. Phoenix also received a second Academy Award nomination as well as a second BAFTA nomination, this time in the Best Lead Actor category. Earlier that year, he narrated Earthlings (2005), a documentary about the investigation of animal abuse in factory farms, and pet mills, and for scientific research. He was awarded the Humanitarian Award at the San Diego Film Festival in 2005, for his work and contribution to Earthlings. Animal rights philosopher Tom Regan remarked that "for those who watch Earthlings, the world will never be the same".

Phoenix's first producing task was the action thriller We Own the Night (2007), in which he played nightclub manager Bobby Green/Grusinsky who tries to save his brother (Mark Wahlberg) and father (Robert Duvall) from Russian mafia hitmen. The James Gray-directed film premiered at the 2007 Cannes Film Festival to mixed reviews; Roger Ebert praised Gray's direction and the acting, but criticized its screenplay for lack of originality. David Edelstein of New York magazine commended Phoenix for elevating the film's conflict, writing that it "might be heavy-handed without Phoenix's face—his irresolution somehow more powerful than other actors' resolve. There is no artifice. He's not an actor disappearing into a role but a man disappearing into himself [...] Phoenix homes in on the truth of this person. It's the paradox of the greatest acting".

Later that year, he played a father obsessed with finding out who killed his son in a hit-and-run accident in his second feature with Terry George, the crime drama film Reservation Road. The film received mixed reviews from critics; Peter Travers praised Phoenix's acting stating "Even the best actors—and I'd rank Joaquin Phoenix and Mark Ruffalo among their generation's finest—can't save a movie that aims for tragedy but stalls at soap opera." Phoenix also executive produced the television show 4Real, a half-hour program which began airing in 2007. The series showcased celebrity guests on global adventures "in order to connect with young leaders who are creating social and economic change".

In 2008, Phoenix starred as a suicidal bachelor torn between the family friend his parents wish he would marry and his beautiful but volatile new neighbor in Gray's Two Lovers. The romantic drama premiered at the 2008 Cannes Film Festival. Reviews for the film and Phoenix's performance were positive; The New York Times Magazine's chief critic called it his best performance to date and Ray Bennett of The Hollywood Reporter felt that Phoenix led the film with "great intelligence and enormous charm, making his character's conflict utterly believable". During the promotion of Two Lovers, Phoenix had started to film his next performance for the mockumentary film I'm Still Here (2010), which the media felt overshadowed the former's theatrical release. I'm Still Here purports to follow the life of Phoenix, from the announcement of his retirement from acting, through his transition into a career as a hip-hop artist managed by rap icon Sean "Diddy" Combs. Directed by Phoenix's then brother-in-law Casey Affleck and co-written by Affleck and Phoenix, the little-seen film premiered at the 67th Venice International Film Festival to mixed reviews; critics were divided on whether to interpret the film as documentary or performance art. After its release, Phoenix explained that the idea for the feature arose from his amazement that people believed reality television shows' claims of being unscripted. By claiming to retire from acting, he and Affleck planned to make a film that "explored celebrity, and explored the relationship between the media and the consumers and the celebrities themselves" through their film.

=== 2011–2019: Established career and continued acclaim ===
In 2011, it was announced that Phoenix would star in Paul Thomas Anderson's drama film The Master, which traces the relationship between Freddie Quell (Phoenix), a World War II navy veteran struggling to adjust to a post-war society and Lancaster Dodd (Philip Seymour Hoffman), a leader of a religious movement known as "The Cause". To create the character, Phoenix lost a significant amount of weight and went to a dentist to help force his jaw shut on one side; a trait his own father had. The film premiered at the 2012 Venice Film Festival where he won the Volpi Cup for Best Actor. The arthouse film only grossed $28 million but was received with critical acclaim, with Phoenix's performance receiving high praise. Peter Travers called it the performance of his career writing "Acting doesn't get better or go deeper[...]Phoenix wears the role like a second skin. You can't take your eyes off him." His performance as Freddie was described as "career-defining" by Todd McCarthy of The Hollywood Reporter, who was impressed that Anderson and Phoenix collaboratively were able to build such complex work around such a derelict figure. Fellow actor Daniel Day-Lewis publicly lauded the "remarkable" Phoenix while accepting the Screen Actors Guild Award, apologizing for the fact that Phoenix hadn't been nominated for the same award. Despite this, Phoenix received his third Academy, Golden Globe and BAFTA nominations for his leading role.

Phoenix and Gray's fourth collaboration came with The Immigrant (2013), a drama film in which he played the supporting role of a pimp who prostitutes Polish immigrant Ewa (Marion Cotillard) and ends up falling for her. The Immigrant and his performance premiered to highly positive reviews at the 2013 Cannes Film Festival. In his review, Ignatiy Vishnevetsky of The A.V. Club thought the film featured one of his best performances and commended Phoenix's and Gray's developing work, writing of that "the two are so perfectly in sync, that it's hard to tell where Phoenix's performance ends and Gray's visual style[...]—begins", further lauding their development of Bruno into "a fully fledged tragic character, even though he is neither the protagonist of The Immigrant nor the main driving force behind its plot".

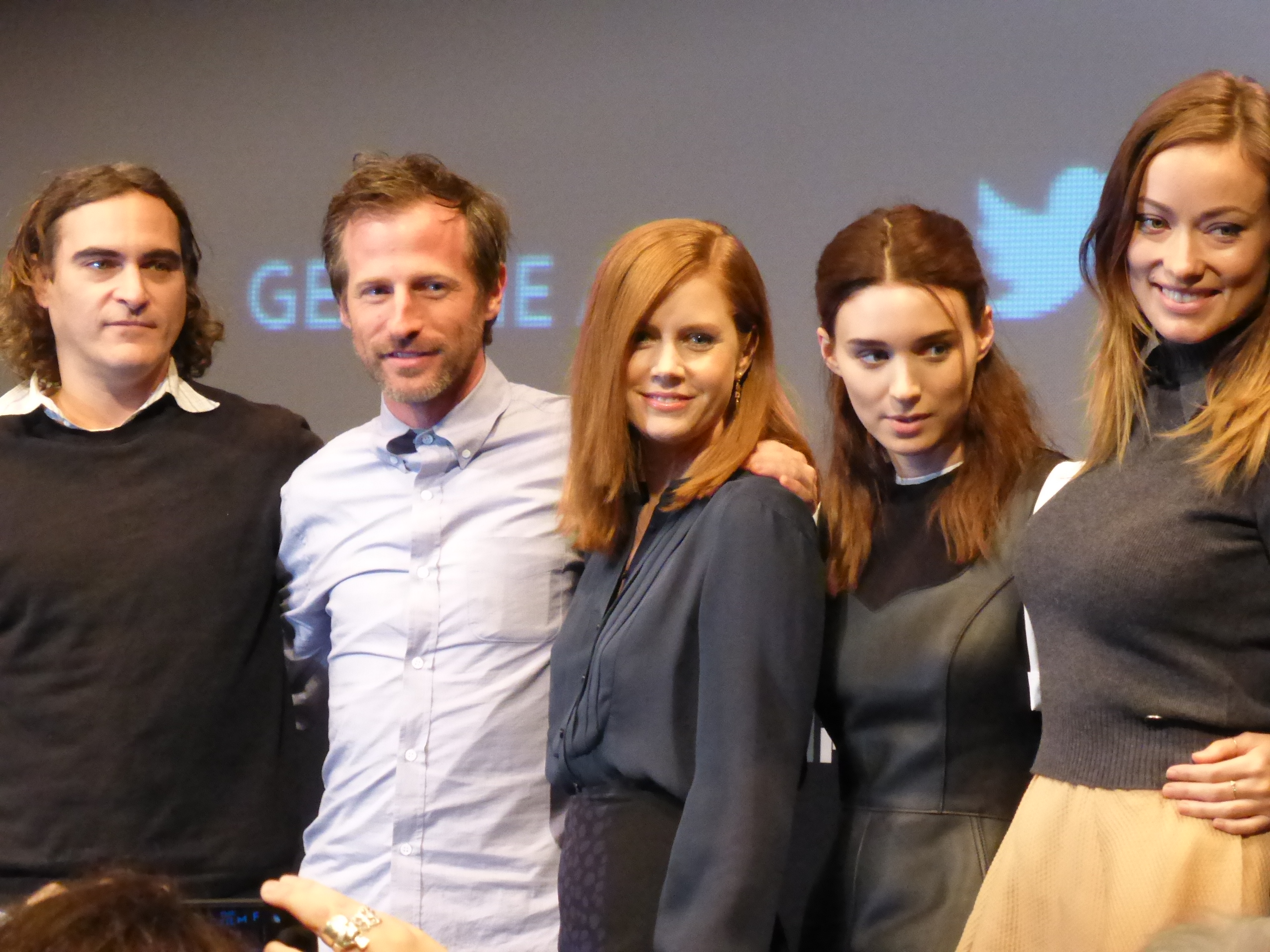
Phoenix (far left) with director Spike Jonze and the cast of Her at the 2013 New York Film Festival

His next feature film of that year was the Spike Jonze-directed romantic science-fiction drama Her. He played Theodore Twombly, a man who develops a relationship with Samantha (Scarlett Johansson), an intelligent computer operating system personified through a female voice. Released to critical acclaim, critic A.A. Dowd of The A.V. Club labeled Phoenix as "one of the most emotionally honest actors in Hollywood", impressed at how he effortlessly unleashes waves of vulnerability in the film's many tight, invasive close-up images, calling it a "tremendous performance, one that rescues this character—a mess of insecurities, regrets, and desires—from the walking pity party he could have been". Her earned more than double of its production budget, and Phoenix received his fourth nomination at the Golden Globes. Several journalists expressed disappointment over his failure to receive an Oscar nomination for it, with Peter Knegt of IndieWire naming it of one of ten worst Oscar acting snubs of the last decade in 2015.

In 2014, Phoenix took on the role of Doc Sportello, a private investigator and hippie/dope head trying to help his ex-girlfriend solve a crime in the crime comedy-drama Inherent Vice, based on Thomas Pynchon's detective novel of the same name. Reviews toward the film were positive; critics praised Phoenix's performance and Paul Thomas Anderson's direction, while some were frustrated by its complicated plot. Robbie Collin of The Daily Telegraph termed Phoenix as Anderson's "perfect leading man" and his work as "the kind of quietly dazzling performance that rarely wins awards but will be adoringly dissected and quoted for decades". Phoenix earned his fifth Golden Globe nomination for the film.

After narrating the sequel to Earthlings, the 2015 animal rights' documentary Unity, Phoenix teamed with director Woody Allen and Emma Stone in the crime mystery film Irrational Man. He played Abe Lucas, a philosophy professor experiencing an existential crisis. The film was released to mixed reviews at the 2015 Cannes Film Festival; The Hollywood Reporter felt that the film was too similar to Allen's previous films, but praised Phoenix's chemistry with Stone and Phoenix for playing the character "with a wonderful baggy, lived-in quality that makes us want to climb inside the character's whiskey-sozzled head".

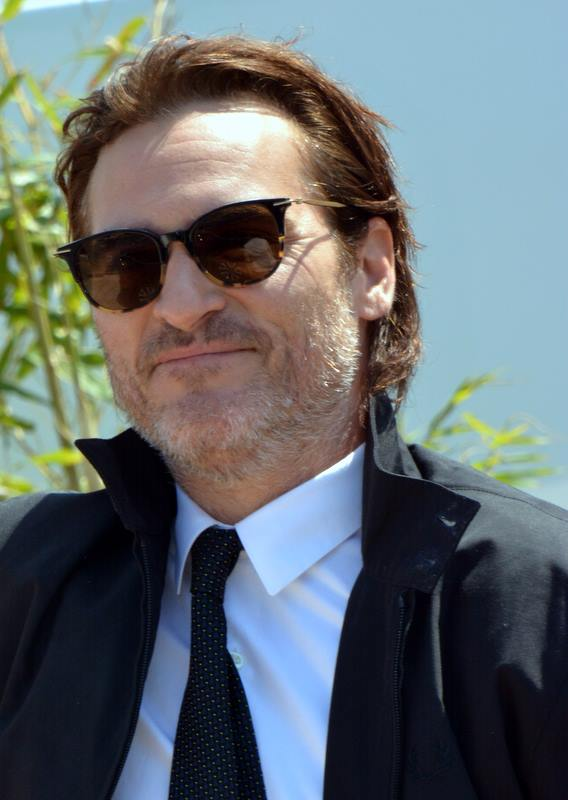
Phoenix attending the premiere of You Were Never Really Here at the 2017 Cannes Film Festival

The thriller You Were Never Really Here, written and directed by Lynne Ramsay and based on the novella of the same name by Jonathan Ames, ranks among the most acclaimed films of Phoenix's career. The film is about Joe (played by Phoenix), a traumatized former FBI agent and Gulf War veteran who tracks down missing girls for a living. To prepare for the film, Phoenix was advised by a former bodyguard who goes on international missions to rescue children suffering sexual exploitation and abuse by human traffickers; he gained a significant amount of weight and muscle for the part. Phoenix was Ramsay's first and only choice to play the veteran, with Ramsay calling him "my soulmate in making movies". The film premiered at the 2017 Cannes Film Festival, where earned Phoenix the Cannes Film Festival Award for Best Actor. Justin Chang of the Los Angeles Times described Phoenix's performance as "the most rivetingly contained" work of his career and Dominick Suzanne-Mayer of Consequence noted that his evocative manners in the film, led to him giving career-high work and "the kind of haunting turn that only comes around a few times every decade or so".

In 2018, Phoenix portrayed Jesus in the biblical drama Mary Magdalene, written by Helen Edmundson and directed by Garth Davis. The film, and his performance, received mixed reviews; a reviewer for Entertainment Weekly thought that Phoenix lacked the quiet compassion and grace that was required for the role, while Nick Allen of Roger Ebert's website described his performance as "a human being who is visibly tormented by the power and wisdom that works through him", deeming it one of the best portrayals of Jesus ever. His next two features — the biopic Don't Worry, He Won't Get Far on Foot and the crime drama The Sisters Brothers — were much better received. In the former, Phoenix reunited with his To Die For director Gus Van Sant to portray quadriplegic cartoonist John Callahan. Barry Hertz of The Globe and Mail wrote that there's no better leading actor producing better work than Phoenix, stating "The actor—never a simple chameleon, but someone who disappears into a role entirely with a frightening conviction—continues to display new and tremendous range here" and David Hughes of Empire thought that in a more conventional film, Phoenix would be the favorite to win an Academy Award.

The third film of 2018 was The Sisters Brothers, Jacques Audiard's adaptation of the novel of the same name by Patrick deWitt. The film starred John C. Reilly and Phoenix as the notorious assassin brothers Eli and Charlie Sisters respectively and chronicles their chase after two men who have banded together to search for gold. Writing for Roger Ebert's website, Tomris Laffly commented on Phoenix's and Reilly's "tremendous chemistry" and Lindsey Behr of the Associated Press opined that the duo "excellently manage all the various tones in the film". Also in 2018, he collaborated with Rooney Mara and Sia to narrate Chris Delforce's documentary Dominion. Animal rights activists have called it one of the most powerful documentaries ever made. For his contribution to the documentary, Phoenix was granted the 2018 Award of Excellence for Narration by Hollywood International Independent Documentary Awards.

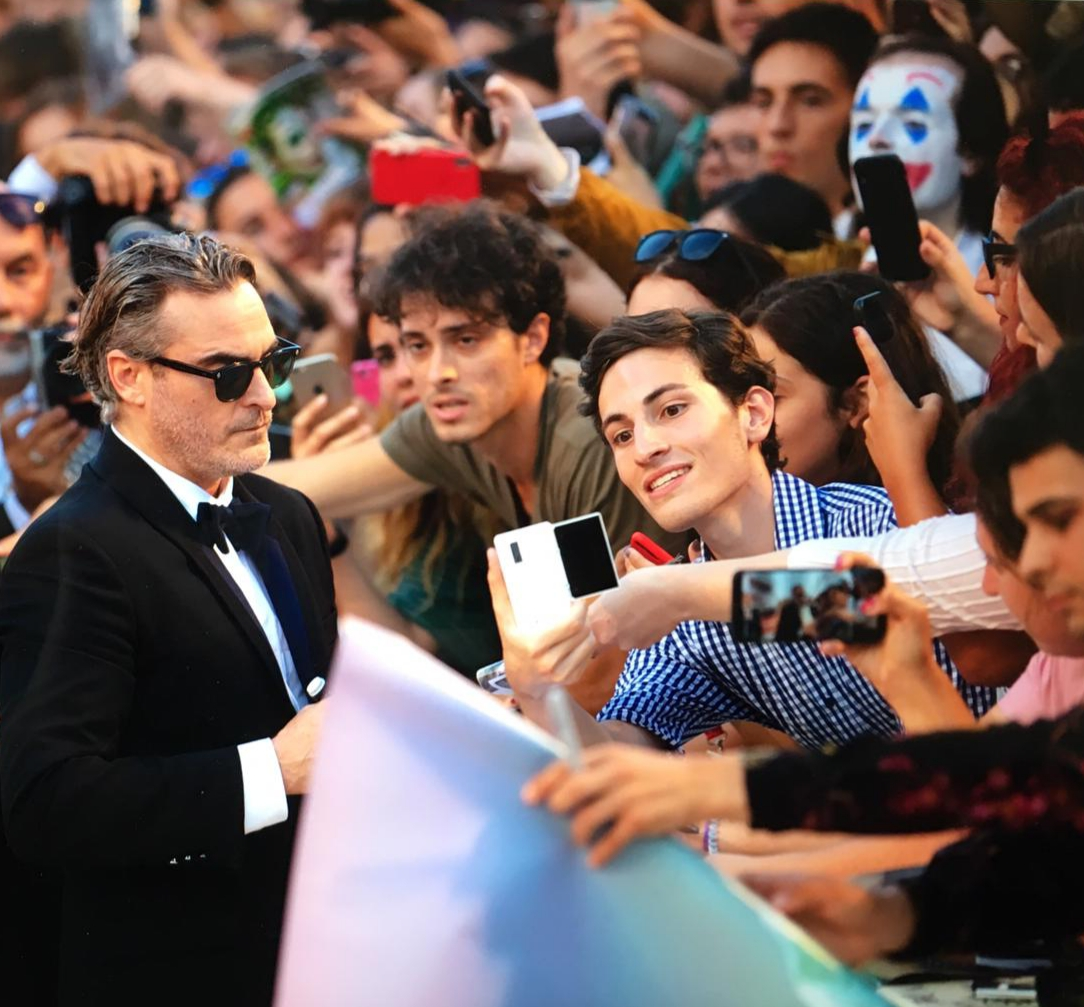
Phoenix signing autographs at the premiere of Joker at the 2019 Venice International Film Festival

In 2019, Phoenix starred as the DC Comics character Joker in Todd Phillips's psychological thriller Joker; an alternative origin story for the character. Set in 1981, the film follows Arthur Fleck, a failed clown and stand-up comedian whose descent into insanity and nihilism inspires a violent counter-cultural revolution against the wealthy in a decaying Gotham City. Phoenix lost 52 pounds (24 kg) in preparation, and based his laugh on "videos of people suffering from pathological laughter". Released to critical acclaim at the 76th Venice International Film Festival, the film experienced a polarized critical reception after its theatrical release. While Phoenix's performance received rave reviews, the dark tone, portrayal of mental illness, and handling of violence divided opinions and generated concerns of inspiring real-life violence; the movie theater where the 2012 Aurora, Colorado, mass shooting occurred during a screening of The Dark Knight Rises refused to show it. Despite this, Joker became a box office success grossing over $1 billion (against its $55 million production budget), the first R-rated film to do so, becoming Phoenix's highest-grossing film. Pete Hammond of Deadline wrote of Phoenix's "extraordinary" performance, describing it as "dazzling risky and original" and The Hollywood Reporter's David Rooney called his performance the "must-see factor" of the film, writing "he inhabits [the character] with an insanity by turns pitiful and fearsome in an out-there performance that's no laughing matter[...]Phoenix is the prime force that makes Joker such a distinctively edgy entry in the Hollywood comics industrial complex." The film earned him numerous awards, including an Academy Award, a Golden Globe, a BAFTA, a SAG and a Critic's Choice Award for Best Actor.

=== 2020–present: Frequent A24 collaborations ===
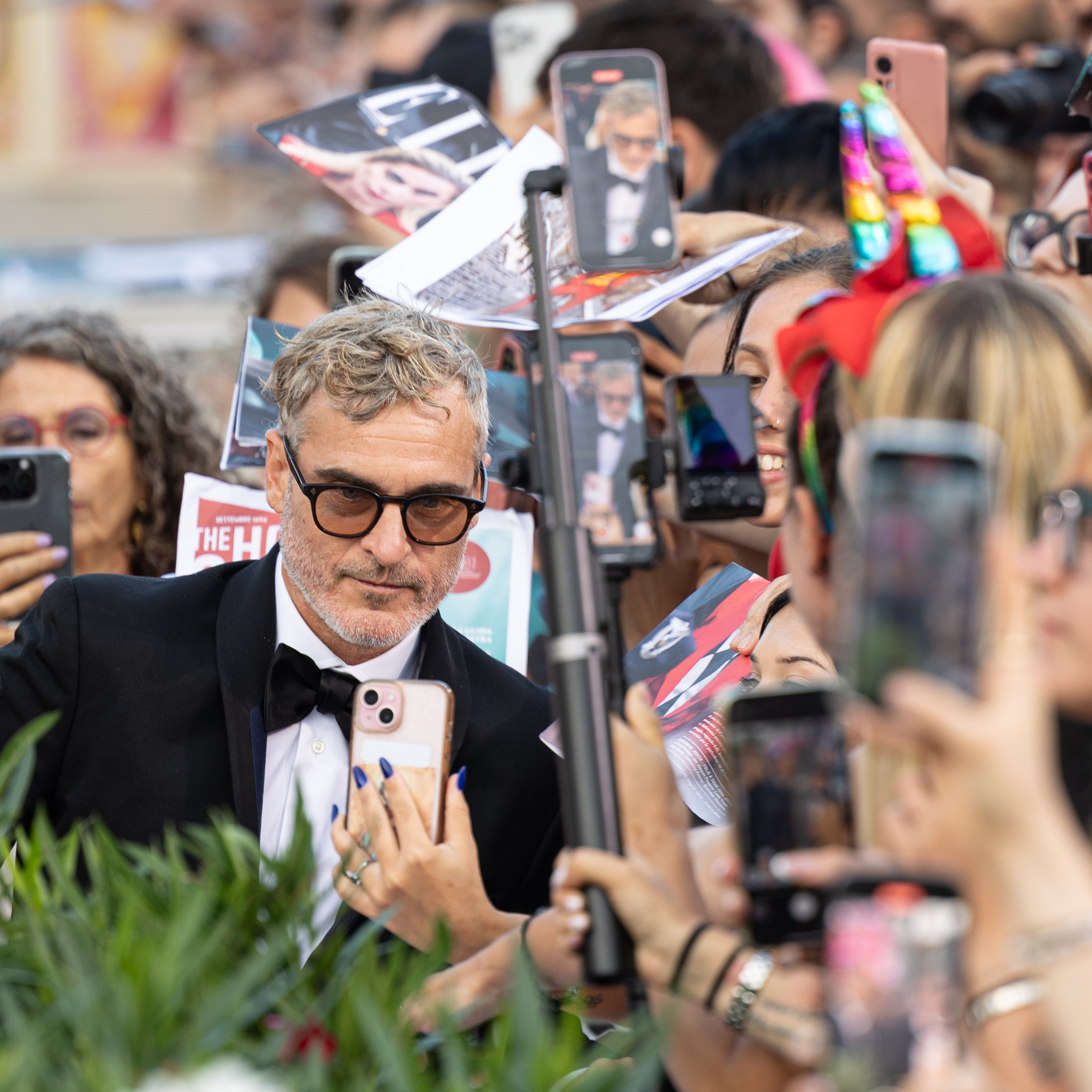
Phoenix at the 81st Venice International Film Festival in 2024.

In 2020, Phoenix served as an executive producer on Gunda, directed by Viktor Kossakovsky. The acclaimed documentary follows the daily life of a pig, two cows, and a one-legged chicken. That same year, Phoenix was named on the list of the 25 Greatest Actors of the 21st Century by The New York Times. The list was compiled by famed critics Manohla Dargis and A.O. Scott and Phoenix's paragraph was written by his frequent collaborator, director James Gray. In 2021, he starred in Mike Mills' drama C'mon C'mon, as Johnny, a radio journalist who embarks on a cross-country trip with his young nephew. The A24 film premiered at the 48th Telluride Film Festival where it scored the best per-venue average for a limited release since the start of the COVID-19 pandemic upon its release. Angelica Jade Bastién of Vulture praised Phoenix, writing "a tremendous showing from Joaquin Phoenix, operating at a register he's rarely found before. It's a career best for him—lovely, empathetic, humane[...]He possesses a warmth that glows from beginning to end. As Johnny, Phoenix listens to people and the world around him with full-bodied curiosity. This is where the bravura lies in the performance: his ability to seemingly just be."

Phoenix starred as Beau Wassermann, the title character in Ari Aster's surrealist black tragicomedy Beau Is Afraid (2023), which was released on April 14, 2023, before a wide release the following week. In it, he portrays a mild-mannered but paranoia-ridden man who embarks on a surreal odyssey to get home to his mother, confronting his greatest fears along the way. The actor shared the cast with Amy Ryan, Nathan Lane and Patti LuPone. The film received generally favorable reviews, with critics crediting Aster's direction and Phoenix and his "sheer commitment" to the role, for giving the film its "undeniable power". Tomris Laffly of TheWrap called his performance as Beau "one of his best performances", praising his ability to act with "a startling level of vulnerability[...]both enigmatic and translucently bare". Phoenix received his seventh Golden Globe nomination for his performance in the film.

Phoenix portrayed Napoleon Bonaparte in Napoleon, his second collaboration with director Ridley Scott, released in November 2023, with Vanessa Kirby as Joséphine de Beauharnais. The film grossed over $200 million and received mixed reviews (though mostly negative reviews in France), mostly criticized for its pacing and historical inaccuracies. For example, the French GQ magazine called the film "deeply clumsy, unnatural, and unintentionally awkward." In 2024, Phoenix reprised his role as Joker in Phillips' sequel Joker: Folie à Deux with Lady Gaga as Harley Quinn. Unlike the first film, it emerged as a critical and commercial failure. Phoenix was originally set to star alongside Danny Ramirez in a film by Todd Haynes, a sexually explicit "love story between two men" set in 1930s Los Angeles. Phoenix had co-written it with Haynes, advising him to "go further" with the explicit material, which Haynes said would have likely made it an NC-17 rated film. The project was canceled when Phoenix abruptly exited five days before filming began.

Phoenix reunited with Ari Aster in the A24 contemporary Western film Eddington (2025) which received positive reviews. He will next reunite with Lynne Ramsay in Polaris, co-starring Rooney Mara.

Phoenix is a signatory of the Film Workers for Palestine boycott pledge that was published in September 2025.

== Reputation and acting style ==
"When I was 15 or 16 my brother River [Phoenix] came home from work and he had a VHS copy of a movie called Raging Bull and he sat me down and made me watch it. And the next day he woke me up, and he made me watch it again. And he said, "You're going to start acting again, this is what you're going to do." He didn't ask me, he just told me. And I am indebted to him for that because acting has given me such an incredible life".

— Phoenix credits his brother River Phoenix for his acting career.

Early in his career, Phoenix was often referred to as "the second most famous Phoenix", his name associated most closely with the death of his brother River Phoenix. The media would often compare the two, with The New York Times describing Joaquin as "sweetly unsettling and endlessly vulnerable" compared to his brother's "pure all-American blond boyishness". After his brother died, Phoenix gained a reputation for his distrust of the media, with many speculating that it is derived from how River's death was covered by the press. He was often asked about the day River died, and still is to this date, Phoenix has described these interviews as "insincere" and has felt that they impeded on the mourning process.

Caroline Frost of The Huffington Post has said that Phoenix is "engaging, engaged, mischievous, honest" in person and Anderson Cooper of 60 Minutes thought that he was "wry, shy and couldn't be any more friendlier" adding that Phoenix "just doesn't like to talk about himself". Although known for his intensity and darkness on-screen, director James Gray who worked with Phoenix in four feature films, says that Phoenix is very different off-screen saying "He's actually very tender and sweet and sensitive. It's almost as if he channels his intensity into the characters. Like the work is an outlet for his darker side."

Phoenix has been described as one of the finest actors of his generation. (Note: Attributed to multiple sources.) As he achieved stardom after Gladiator (2000), he was conveniently ruled out of teen-idol roles because of his hard gaze and scarred lip. Justin Chang, analyzing his career in Los Angeles Times in 2020, remarked that filmmakers immediately seemed to recognize that Phoenix was more than a heartthrob, and that there was "something more tortured, more vulnerable and infinitely more interesting at play beneath the surface". He noted that through his work, Phoenix is challenging and redefining cinematic manhood and that this quality sets him apart from most of his contemporaries. Film critic and film historian Leonard Maltin has called Phoenix "a true chameleon", writing "[Phoenix] commands the screen and breaks your heart; he makes us feel it all vicariously."

Phoenix is particularly known for his ability to heavily commit to each role he plays and his intense preparations, deeply immersing himself in the characters, often blurring the lines between fiction and reality. That immersion was particularly evident during the filming of the mockumentary I'm Still Here (2010), when Phoenix announced to the world that he was retiring from acting to become a rapper. Throughout the filming period, Phoenix remained in character for public appearances, giving many the impression that he was genuinely pursuing a new career. Media outlets worldwide believed that Phoenix was having a mental breakdown after his infamous appearance on The Late Show with David Letterman. Confusion from the media turned to concern as the seemingly drug-addled Phoenix continued his attempts to convince crowds he was serious about a rap career. Many worried his erratic behavior was a sign he was stuck in a downward spiral, and headed down the same self-destructive path that took the life of his older brother. Although widely suspected to be a mockumentary, the fact that the events of the film had been deliberately staged was not disclosed until after the film had been released. To this day, some people believe he went through a personal meltdown during the filming period. Phoenix has credited the making of I'm Still Here for allowing him to make bolder choices in acting.

Phoenix contends there's no real methodology to the roles he chooses, but has said that he is drawn to complex characters. He speculates that his affinity for dark roles derives from something more ineffable, possibly prenatal saying that "I think there is a combination of nature and nurture[...]—and some of it is my upbringing." Even so, Phoenix remains reluctant to draw a line between his unusual childhood, his private tragedy and his talent for "inhabiting the morose, damaged, violent, and otherwise anxiety-riddled characters". James Gray has described Phoenix as "one of the most incorruptible people I've ever known, and the least superficial", and has spoken of his acting, saying that he admires Phoenix's "limitless ability to surprise you in the best ways and inspire you to move in a direction that you haven't thought of originally, better than what you have in mind".

Garth Davis, who directed Phoenix in Mary Magdalene (2018), has remarked that he does not apply method acting, but said that working with Phoenix is like "working with this beautiful wild animal, where you have to give him the space to be free, so his performance can roam freely: raw, uncontrived and truly natural. If he smells the design of the scene, you lose his free spirit; if the script is weak, he will expose its flaws. He is fiercely intelligent and almost completely instinctual. And he has this immense sensitivity that can be both his curse and his gift, but for me, that is what it means to be human". In an interview with The Guardian in 2015, Phoenix said that he prefers independent film over major studio film, citing that "the quality of acting suffers".

In 2019, Phoenix stated that in choosing films, he solely relies on the director, "I don't really care about genre or budget size, anything like that. It's just whether there is a filmmaker that has a unique vision, has a voice, and the ability to make the film." For Phoenix, a great performance is in the director's hands – it's ultimately the director's world he's entering. He maintains that the director creates the character's arc and that the best directors adjust to what is happening with the actor in the moment.

Phoenix has cited Robert De Niro as one of his favorite actors and strongest acting influences. Phoenix recalled watching Raging Bull for the first time in an interview, "I think it just… awakened something in me. And I could suddenly see it through his eyes. There's a part in Raging Bull where De Niro meets a girl in between a chain-link fence. And he, you know, shakes her pinky and it's like this just beautiful little detail, it's this wonderful moment. And I think that in some ways is what I'm always looking for."

== Other ventures ==
=== Music ===
Phoenix has directed music videos for Ringside, She Wants Revenge, People in Planes, Arckid, Albert Hammond Jr., and Silversun Pickups. He was said to have produced the opening track for Pusha T's My Name Is My Name album alongside Kanye West. The track is called "King Push". Phoenix then denied in a statement to XXL having produced the record, saying, "While it was widely reported that Pusha T used my beat and that I produced his song, I can't take any credit. A friend's son played me his music, and all I did was make an introduction to Kanye [West]'s camp."

=== Animal rights activism ===
Phoenix is identified as one of the most active celebrities in the animal rights movement. A vegan since age three, he does not wear any clothes made out of animal skin; he requests that all of his leather costumes in films are made from synthetic materials. Phoenix has said that animal rights are one of the most important pillars in his life, and maintains that "climate change is imminent if we do not adopt a plant-based lifestyle". He has helped raise awareness of the correlation between animal rights, climate change and health issues.

Phoenix has received praise and accolades from animal rights groups, with PETA naming him "Person of the Year" in 2019. PETA's president, Ingrid Newkirk said: "Joaquin Phoenix never misses an opportunity to turn the spotlight away from himself and onto animals' plight and to set a great example of walking the vegan walk". He has been an active supporter of numerous animal rights organizations, including PETA.

"We go into the natural world, and we plunder it for its resources. We feel entitled to artificially inseminate a cow, and when she gives birth, we steal her baby, even though her cries of anguish are unmistakable. Then we take her milk that's intended for her calf, and we put it in our coffee and our cereal. And I think we fear the idea of personal change because we think that we have to sacrifice something, to give something up, but human beings, at our best, are so inventive and creative and ingenious. And I think that when we use love and compassion as our guiding principles, we can create, develop and implement systems of change that are beneficial to all sentient beings and to the environment."

— Phoenix during his acceptance speech at the 2020 Academy Awards

Throughout the years, Phoenix has headlined numerous campaigns for different organizations to help promote veganism and end animal slaughter. In 2019, Phoenix and his partner Rooney Mara led the National Animal Rights Day demonstration to help spread awareness for animal rights. On January 10, 2020, Phoenix was arrested with actress Jane Fonda at a climate change protest outside the United States Capitol in Washington, D.C. At the protest, Phoenix spoke about the link between animal agriculture and climate change.

Phoenix has also been vocal in drawing attention to the suffering of fish, which he sees as a neglected cause in the sphere of animal rights. Fish, says Phoenix, are the "last thing besides insects that people don't really consider". Phoenix's views were shaped by a childhood incident in which he saw fish brutally flung against the side of the boat. In 2013, he simulated drowning in a 41-second PETA spot, designed to dramatize how fish suffer in the final moments of their lives. The video was shot by photographer Michael Muller.

During the 2019–20 awards season, amid protesting for animal rights, Phoenix had been driving a behind-the-scenes movement that transformed five events to meat-free menus, beginning with the Golden Globe Awards. He acknowledged the Hollywood Foreign Press Association during his acceptance speech, for its "very bold move making tonight plant-based. It really sends a powerful message." Soon after, Critics' Choice and SAG followed suit. Phoenix contacted the presidents of the award ceremonies, accompanied by signatures from the likes of fellow nominees Leonardo DiCaprio and Phoebe Waller-Bridge. Phoenix's pitch was that meat agriculture is a leading cause of climate change and that the televised spectacles should use their platforms to address pressing societal issues. The Academy Awards later announced that all food served at the Dolby Theatre before the Oscars was going to be vegan. Lisa Lange, Senior Vice President of Communications at PETA, spoke of Phoenix's power saying "He knows what can be done. He knows he's in a good position to push. He enlists friends. And it works. He can have influence in Hollywood and it influences the rest of the world."

A day after winning the Academy Award for Best Actor, and subsequently delivering a headlining acceptance speech in which he spoke to the plight of mother cows and their babies used in animal agriculture, Phoenix helped to rescue a cow and her newborn calf from a Los Angeles slaughterhouse. They were taken to Farm Sanctuary, an animal sanctuary and advocacy organization, where they will live out the rest of their lives. The same month, he starred in Guardians of Life, the first of twelve short films by the environmental organization Mobilize Earth that highlighted the most pressing issues facing humanity and the natural world. Funds raised by the project went to Amazon Watch and Extinction Rebellion. Dávid Szőke and Sándor Kiss in Film International were highly critical of this move, arguing that "what is rather mind-boggling is that the discourse centers less on the issue of the calf and its mother or the exploitation of our natural world, and more on Phoenix in the leading role as the savior of our planet, raising questions about the narrative's alignment with his environmental activism."

Two animal species have been named after him. In 2011, a trilobite species was named Gladiatoria phoenix for his iconic role in the 2000 film Gladiator, and in 2020, a spider species endemic to Iran was named Loureedia phoenixi (also known as the Joker spider) due to its color pattern matching the DC Comics character Joker, for his role in the 2019 film Joker.

=== Other activism ===
In 2020, Phoenix collaborated with JusticeLA to create a public service announcement #SuingToSaveLives about the health of people in L.A. County jails amid the COVID-19 pandemic.

In October 2023, Phoenix signed an open letter by artists to President Joe Biden calling for a ceasefire during the Gaza war. The letter reads: "We believe all life is sacred, no matter faith or ethnicity and we condemn the killing of Palestinian and Israeli civilians." In May 2025, Phoenix was one of 370 Hollywood figures to sign an open letter condemning the film industry for its "silence" on the Gaza genocide and Israel's killing of Fatma Hassona.

== Personal life ==
=== Views and lifestyle ===
After reestablishing himself as an actor in the mid-1990s, Phoenix moved back to Los Angeles. He is known for his disdain of celebrity culture, rarely granting interviews, and being reticent about discussing his private life. In 2018, he described himself as a secular Jew who did not affiliate with any organized religion; one of his "core values" is the idea of forgiveness. He has also claimed that his mother believes in Jesus, though his parents were not religious. While portraying Jesus in the 2018 movie Mary Magdalene, he expressed that the role changed his perspective on the nature of forgiveness. Phoenix is an atheist.

In early April 2005, Phoenix checked himself into rehab to be treated for alcoholism. Twelve years later, he revealed that he did not need an intervention: "I really just thought of myself as a hedonist. I was an actor in L.A. I wanted to have a good time. But I wasn't engaging with the world or myself in the way I wanted to". On January 26, 2006, while driving down a winding canyon road in Hollywood, Phoenix veered off the road and flipped his car. The crash was reportedly caused by brake failure. Shaken and confused, he heard someone tapping on his window and telling him to "just relax". Unable to see the man, Phoenix replied, "I'm fine. I am relaxed." The man replied, "No, you're not." The man then stopped Phoenix from lighting a cigarette while gasoline was leaking into the car cabin. Phoenix realized that the man was German filmmaker Werner Herzog. While Herzog helped Phoenix out of the wreckage by breaking the back window of the car, bystanders called an ambulance. Phoenix later approached Herzog to express his gratitude.

In 2012, Phoenix labeled the Academy Awards "bullshit". He later gave an interview apologizing for his comments and acknowledged that the awards provided an important platform for many deserving filmmakers. He elaborated on the topic while on Jimmy Kimmel Live! in 2015, explaining that he was uncomfortable receiving accolades for his work, considering the filmmaking process a collaborative one.

A longtime vegan, Phoenix finds animal agriculture "absurd and barbaric". He explained his reasoning behind his veganism: "To me, it just seems obvious—I don't want to cause pain to another living empathetic creature. I don't want to take its babies away from it, I don't want to force it to be indoors and fattened up just to be slaughtered. Certainly, also, the effect that it has on our environment is devastating. So, for me, it's my life and has always been my life, and it's really one of the most important things to me."

Phoenix is on the board of directors for The Lunchbox Fund, a non-profit organization which provides daily meals to students of township schools in Soweto, South Africa, founded by Topaz Page-Green.

=== Relationships and family ===
From 1995 to 1998, Phoenix dated his Inventing the Abbotts co-star Liv Tyler. The two remain close friends, with Tyler considering Phoenix and his sisters as her family. He was romantically involved with South African model Topaz Page-Green from 2001 to 2005. From 2013 to 2015 he was in a relationship with artist Allie Teilz.

In 2012, Phoenix met Her co-star Rooney Mara. The two remained friends and began a romantic relationship four years later, during the making of Mary Magdalene. They were engaged in 2019 and married some time after. In August 2020, the couple had a son. In June 2024, they welcomed their daughter. They reside in the Hollywood Hills.

Phoenix has described his family life as simple. He enjoys meditating, watching documentaries, reading scripts, and taking karate classes. He has a black belt in karate.

== Acting credits and accolades ==
Phoenix has been recognized by the Academy of Motion Picture Arts and Sciences for the following performances:

- 73rd Academy Awards (2001): Best Supporting Actor, nomination, as Commodus in Gladiator
- 78th Academy Awards (2006): Best Actor, nomination, as John R. "Johnny" Cash in Walk the Line
- 85th Academy Awards (2013): Best Actor, nomination, as Freddie Quell in The Master
- 92nd Academy Awards (2020): Best Actor, win, as Arthur Fleck / Joker in Joker

Phoenix has won two Golden Globe Awards: Best Actor – Motion Picture Musical or Comedy for Walk the Line and Best Actor – Motion Picture Drama for Joker, a BAFTA Award for Best Actor in a Leading Role and an Actor Award for Outstanding Performance by a Male Actor in a Leading Role for Joker. Phoenix was awarded the Grammy Award for Best Compilation Soundtrack for Visual Media for the Walk The Line soundtrack. He has also won the Volpi Cup for Best Actor for The Master and the Cannes Film Festival Award for Best Actor for You Were Never Really Here.

== See also ==
- List of atheists in film, radio, television and theater
- List of actors with Academy Award nominations
- List of actors with more than one Academy Award nomination in the acting categories
- List of siblings with Academy Award acting nominations
- List of Jewish Academy Award winners and nominees
- List of Puerto Ricans
- List of animal rights advocates
- List of vegans
