= We Own the Night (film) =

- Theatrical release poster
- Directed by: James Gray
- Written by: James Gray
- Produced by: Marc Butan; Joaquin Phoenix; Mark Wahlberg; Nick Wechsler
- Starring: Joaquin Phoenix; Mark Wahlberg; Eva Mendes; Robert Duvall
- Cinematography: Joaquín Baca-Asay
- Edited by: John Axelrad
- Music by: Wojciech Kilar
- Production companies: Columbia Pictures; 2929 Productions
- Distributed by: Sony Pictures Releasing
- Release dates: May 25, 2007 (Cannes); October 12, 2007 (United States)
- Running time: 117 minutes
- Country: United States
- Language: English
- Budget: $21–28 million
- Box office: $55.3 million

We Own the Night is a 2007 American crime drama film directed and written by James Gray, co-produced by and starring Joaquin Phoenix and Mark Wahlberg, and co-starring Eva Mendes and Robert Duvall. It is the third film directed by Gray, and the second to feature Phoenix and Wahlberg together, the first being 2000's The Yards. The title comes from the motto of the NYPD's Street Crimes Unit, which disbanded in 2002, and again in 2020.

The film premiered on May 25, 2007, at the 2007 Cannes Film Festival, and was released in the United States on October 12, 2007, ultimately receiving mixed reviews from critics and grossing $55 million.

== Plot ==
In November 1988 in Brooklyn, New York, Robert "Bobby" Grusinsky is the manager of the El Caribe nightclub in Brighton Beach, which is owned by his boss, fur importer Marat Buzhayev, whose nephew, drug lord Vadim Nezhinski, is a patron of the joint. Estranged from both his father Albert ("Burt"), an NYPD Deputy Chief, and brother Joseph, a newly minted Captain, Bobby uses the maiden name of his late mother, Carol Green, as a part of his work alias and opts for a life of pleasure with his girlfriend Amada Juarez and best friend Louis "Jumbo" Falsetti, with a plan to soon run his own club in Manhattan. Joseph, who has just been named to be the head of a new anti-drug unit, warns Bobby that he will soon lead a bust on the spot with the aim of netting Vadim.

Bobby is jailed for drug possession and resisting arrest in the wake of the raid on November 22, souring his ties with Burt and Joseph, who both bail him out of jail the next day; he and Joseph later engage in a harsh feud. That evening, a masked Vadim shoots Joseph in the face outside his house and firebombs his car, causing him to be confined at Jamaica Hospital Medical Center for 4 months. A remorseful Bobby agrees to the request of Michael Solo, a comrade of Burt, to go inside Vadim's drug operation behind Burt's back. When the transceiver hidden in his lighter is exposed, he evades death as Vadim is nabbed by the police.

The bond between Bobby and Amada decays while they are hiding at the Kew Motor Inn, and they prep for a move to the Corona Hotel after Vadim flees from Rikers Island on March 20, 1989. In the midst of a heavy deluge, his men ambush the three-car escort, one of whom fatally wounds Burt with a shot to the neck. Bobby passes out in the rain upon seeing his body, wakes up a few hours later atop a bed in a suite at the Sheraton near Kennedy Airport, and breaks down when Joseph tells him that Burt is dead. At the funeral, Jack Shapiro, a colleague of Burt, donates Burt's Korean War combat ribbon to Joseph, and Michael informs him of a Russian cocaine shipment that is set to arrive in the area in the next week.

Amada breaks up with Bobby once he chooses to join the NYPD to avenge the death of his father, upset because he neglected to ask for her input or consent prior to pursuing such a risky change of career. Sworn into the force due to his special knowledge, provided that he will undergo training at the Police Academy once the case is wrapped up, he questions Jumbo outside El Caribe on the night of April 2, 1989; Jumbo admits that he was coerced into betraying Bobby by leaking word from Amada regarding the pair's location to Marat and Vadim. The brothers plan a final sting set for that Tuesday, as he recounts that per Jumbo, Marat's grandchildren, whom he takes to Floyd Bennett Field on Tuesdays, act as his couriers. During the sting, Joseph is numbed by his prior injury and is thus unable to proceed, and so Bobby chases Vadim into the reed beds. As the police, having cuffed Marat, toss flares, he goes into the beds, defying Michael's pleas to wait until Vadim comes out. He then spots and kills him with a fatal blow to the chest from his gun.

On November 3, 1989, Bobby, now clad in his NYPD dress blues, graduates from the academy. Prior to the ceremony, Joseph reveals to him that he will transfer to a post in the Personnel Bureau so as to freely spend more time at home with his wife and 3 children. As the chaplain states in his opening remarks that Bobby will deliver the valedictorian address after the invocation, noting him as the highest academic achiever of his class, Bobby eyes a woman in the crowd who faintly resembles Amada and accepts that their romantic relationship is over. During the invocation, the siblings, seated side by side on stage, softly express their brotherly love.

== Cast ==
- Joaquin Phoenix as Robert "Bobby Green" Grusinsky
- Mark Wahlberg as Captain Joseph "Joe" Grusinsky, Bobby's brother
- Eva Mendes as Amada Juarez, Bobby's girlfriend
- Robert Duvall as Deputy Chief Albert "Burt" Grusinsky, Bobby and Joe's father
- Antoni Corone as Lieutenant Michael Solo, a comrade of Bobby's family
- Moni Moshonov as Marat Buzhayev
- Danny Hoch as Louis "Jumbo" Falsetti, Bobby's best friend and the assistant manager of El Caribe
- Tony Musante as Captain Jack Shapiro, a comrade of Bobby's family
- Paul Herman as NYPD Deputy Commissioner Spiro Giavannis
- Alex Veadov as Vadim Nezhinski, Marat's nephew
- Oleg Taktarov as Pavel Lubyarski, Vadim's right-hand man
- Dominic Colon as Freddie, the bouncer at El Caribe
- Craig Walker as Detective Russell De Keifer
- Fred Burrell as NYPD Commissioner Patrick Ruddy
- Yelena Solovey as Kalina Buzhayev, Marat's wife
- Maggie Kiley as Sandra Grusinsky, Joseph's wife
- Edward Shkolnikov as Eli Mirichenko, the husband of Marat and Kalina's daughter Masha
- Edward Conlon as Hospital Guard
- Coati Mundi as himself
- Ed Koch, who was Mayor of New York City during the time frame in which the film is set, cameos as himself.

== Reception ==
=== Critical response ===
On Rotten Tomatoes, 57% of 153 critics gave We Own the Night positive reviews, with an average rating of 5.8/10. The website's critical consensus reads, "Bland characters, clichéd dialogue and rickety plotting ensure We Own The Night never lives up to its potential." On Metacritic, the film has a weighted average score of 59 out of 100, based on 33 critics, indicating "mixed or average reviews". Audiences surveyed by CinemaScore gave the film a grade "B−" on an A+ to F scale.

Roger Ebert of the Chicago Sun-Times wrote: "This is an atmospheric, intense film, well acted, and when it's working it has a real urgency." Peter Travers of Rolling Stone called it "defiantly, refreshingly unhip" and gave it 3 out of 4.

=== Box office ===
In its opening weekend in the United States and Canada, the film grossed $10.8 million in 2,362 theaters, ranking #3 at the box office. The film grossed a total of $55.3 million worldwide — $28.6 million in the United States and Canada and $26.7 million in other territories.

In April 2006, after acquiring multiple international rights, Universal Pictures announced its acquisition of domestic rights to the film. However, Sony Pictures later paid $11 million for the domestic rights, releasing it through its Columbia Pictures division.

By June 2017, the film had totaled $22 million in DVD sales and $32 million in DVD rentals.
