= Two Lovers (2008 film) =

- Theatrical release poster
- Directed by: James Gray
- Written by: James Gray; Richard Menello
- Produced by: Donna Gigliotti; James Gray; Anthony Katagas
- Starring: Joaquin Phoenix; Gwyneth Paltrow; Vinessa Shaw; Isabella Rossellini; Elias Koteas; Moni Moshonov
- Cinematography: Joaquin Baca-Asay
- Edited by: John Axelrad
- Music by: Wojciech Kilar
- Production companies: 2929 Productions; Wild Bunch; Tempesta Film
- Distributed by: Magnolia Pictures
- Release dates: May 19, 2008 (Cannes Film Festival); February 13, 2009 (United States)
- Running time: 110 minutes
- Country: United States
- Language: English
- Box office: $16.3 million

Two Lovers is a 2008 American romantic drama film, directed by James Gray, and starring Joaquin Phoenix, Gwyneth Paltrow, and Vinessa Shaw. The film takes its inspiration from Fyodor Dostoyevsky's 1848 short story "White Nights", which had already been turned into a film seven times, first by Luchino Visconti: Le Notti Bianche (1957). It is set in the largely Russian Jewish neighborhood Brighton Beach in New York City, as was Gray's first film Little Odessa. Two Lovers premiered in competition at the 2008 Cannes Film Festival in May. The film was Gray's third to enter the competition at this festival. It was released on February 13, 2009.

== Plot ==
Leonard Kraditor walks along a bridge over a stream in Brooklyn before jumping into the water in an attempted suicide. He changes his mind and quickly walks to the home where he resides with his parents. His mother Ruth, seeing him dripping wet, tells her husband Reuben their son has tried it again and it becomes evident that Leonard has attempted suicide before.

His parents tell him that a potential business partner and his family are invited for dinner that night and ask him to be present. When they arrive, Leonard finds that he had been set up with the other family's daughter, Sandra Cohen. She inquires about his interest in photography and notices a photo of a girl above his headboard. He explains he had been engaged to the girl for several years, but the relationship was broken off when it turned out both he and his fiancée carried the gene for Tay–Sachs disease, which results in diseased children who generally do not live beyond the age of five years, so they would be unable to have healthy children.

Leonard meets a new neighbor, Michelle Rausch, and is immediately attracted to her, choosing to ignore that she is a drug addict. He learns that she is dating a married partner in the law firm where he, Ronald Blatt, practices. At her request, Leonard agrees to meet the pair for dinner at a restaurant. The couple leave him later that evening, as they have plans to attend the Metropolitan Opera. Leonard returns home dejected, but Sandra arrives, sent over by Leonard's parents. Believing that Leonard wanted her to come by, she realizes by his shocked expression that she was set up. She apologizes for the misunderstanding and says that, if he is not interested, a lot of other guys are. Leonard says that he likes her, and they kiss and eventually have sex. With time, his relationship with Sandra deepens.

Michelle calls Leonard and says she is sick. He takes her to the hospital, where she has a D&C for a miscarriage. She had been unaware she was pregnant and is even more angry that Ronald ignored her calls. Leonard takes her home but hides when Ronald arrives unexpectedly. Ronald apologizes to Michelle for not having come to her aid. Michelle asks Ronald to leave and then asks Leonard to write something on her forearm with his finger while she falls asleep. Leonard writes "I love you".

Two weeks later, Michelle meets Leonard on the roof of their building and tells him that she has broken up with Ronald and is going to San Francisco. Leonard tells her not to leave and professes his love for her. They have sex and plan to leave together the next day for San Francisco.

On New Year's Eve, Leonard buys an engagement ring for Michelle. Sandra's father Michael then summons him and offers him a partnership in the family businesses, assuming that he is going to marry Sandra. Noticing the jeweler's gift bag Leonard is holding, the father assumes it is for Sandra; Leonard lies that it is.

During his parents' New Year's Eve party, Leonard hides in the courtyard to meet Michelle. Michelle arrives late and tells Leonard that she is not going to San Francisco, because Ronald, having learned that Michelle is leaving him for California, has decided to leave his wife and children for her. Disheartened, Leonard permanently breaks things off with her.

Feeling depressed, Leonard heads to the beach, intending to kill himself. When he drops a glove that Sandra had bought for him, he realizes that, in Sandra, he has found someone who loves him and with whom he can build a happy life. He picks up the glove and sees the boxed engagement ring lying on the sand, where he had thrown it from the boardwalk moments before. He returns to the party, where he gives Sandra the ring and embraces her in a tearful passionate hug.

== Cast ==
- Joaquin Phoenix as Leonard Kraditor
- Gwyneth Paltrow as Michelle Rausch
- Vinessa Shaw as Sandra Cohen
- Isabella Rossellini as Mrs. Ruth Kraditor
- Moni Moshonov as Mr. Reuben Kraditor
- Elias Koteas as Ronald Blatt
- Bob Ari as Mr. Michael Cohen
- Julie Budd as Mrs. Carol Cohen
- Iain J. Bopp as David Cohen
- David Cale as Jeweler

== Production ==
Director James Gray claimed that Gwyneth Paltrow asked him to inspect her breasts before committing to nude scenes in the film. Paltrow herself has not commented on the claim.

== Reception ==
Two Lovers received largely positive reviews from critics. On the review aggregator website Rotten Tomatoes, 81% of 167 critics' reviews are positive. The website's consensus reads: "Two Lovers is a complex, intriguing, richly-acted romantic drama." Metacritic, which uses a weighted average, assigned the film a score of 74 out of 100, based on 33 critics, indicating "generally favorable" reviews.

Ray Bennett from The Hollywood Reporter defined the film as "an old-fashioned love story in which the melodramatic trapdoors of shock and surprise never open" and added that the film "will please many and it may win awards", though "the acting is (...) restrained." He also lauded the film as "a throwback to the days when love in the movies involved the mind as well as the heart."

=== Accolades ===
Award	Category	Nominee	Result	Ref.
ALMA Awards	Actor in Film	Joaquin Phoenix	Nominated	
Cahiers du Cinéma	Top 10 Film Award – Best Film	James Gray	5th place	
Cannes Film Festival	Palme d'Or	James Gray	Nominated	
César Awards	Best Foreign Film	James Gray	Nominated	
Chicago International Film Festival	Best Feature	James Gray	Nominated	
Independent Spirit Awards	Best Female Lead	Gwyneth Paltrow	Nominated	
Independent Spirit Awards	Best Director	James Gray	Nominated	
National Board of Review Awards	Top Ten Independent Films		Won	
New York Film Critics Online Awards	Top Films of the Year		Won	
Online Film Critics Society Awards	Best Actor	Joaquin Phoenix	Nominated	
Village Voice Film Poll	Best Actor	Joaquin Phoenix	4th place	
Village Voice Film Poll	Best Film		9th place	
Village Voice Film Poll	Best Supporting Actress	Gwyneth Paltrow	6th place	
Village Voice Film Poll	Best Supporting Actress	Vinessa Shaw	9th place	
