= Backwards: The Riddle of Dyslexia =

- ABC Afterschool Special episode
- Episode no.: Season 12; Episode 6
- Directed by: Alexander Grasshoff
- Written by: Arthur Heinemann; Franklin Thompson; Guy Fraumeni
- Original air date: March 7, 1984

"Backwards: The Riddle Of Dyslexia" is a 1984 episode of the American television anthology series ABC Afterschool Special, about dyslexia. It shows how dyslexia is detected and treated. The episode stars 13-year-old River Phoenix in "one of his first major roles" as Brian Ellsworth. Joaquin Phoenix (credited as Leaf Phoenix) also stars as his younger brother Robby. According to allmovie, Brian Ellsworth is a junior high student "who has a habit of writing his words – and the letters – backwards. Brian's friends think he's kidding, his teachers think he's lazy, and his parents think he's slow. In truth, Brian has dyslexia and suffers from societal misconceptions and Ableist idiocy."

== Plot ==
Brian Ellsworth is a good student, but cannot read well. When he is at school, he tries to avoid reading and writing, and whenever the teacher tells him to write he disturbs the lesson. Most of the teachers believe that Brian is lazy. Brian's classmates think that Brian enjoys annoying the teachers. Only one of his teachers wants to help Brian. She tries to find out the reasons behind his behavior. Brian's classmate, Kim, also tries to help Brian. She gives him private lessons. When it is discovered that Brian has dyslexia, he finally gets the help he needs. He slowly learns to write and read.

== Overview ==
Backwards: The Riddle of Dyslexia is a television family drama directed by Alexander Grasshoff. It aired as an ABC Afterschool Special on March 7, 1984. In 1989 Backwards: The Riddle of Dyslexia was released on VHS in the United States. It was also shown at schools as an educational programme about dyslexia. It was meant for students from grade four to six.

It was one of the first major roles for the real-life brothers River Phoenix and Joaquin Phoenix. Joaquin Phoenix got his first award nomination for the film. For River Phoenix it was his third award nomination, after two nominations for his portrayal of Guthrie McFadden in the television series Seven Brides for Seven Brothers.

River Phoenix also had dyslexia. However it wasn't known while River Phoenix was filming Backwards: The Riddle of Dyslexia. In 1986, two years after the film was broadcast, River Phoenix was diagnosed as dyslexic.

In the film many famous dyslexic persons were named, like Albert Einstein, U.S. President Woodrow Wilson, Vice President Nelson Rockefeller, and athlete Caitlyn Jenner. At end of the special General George S. Patton and Thomas Edison are also named.

== Awards ==
- Nominated: Young Artist Award: Best Family Film Made for Television.
- Nominated: Young Artist Award: Best Young Actor in a Family Film Made for Television (shared by River Phoenix and Joaquin Phoenix).
- Won: Daytime Emmy Award: Outstanding Achievement in Film Editing (Michael J. Lynch)
- Nominated: Daytime Emmy Award: Outstanding Achievement in Cinematography (Gregory M. Cummins)
- Nominated: Daytime Emmy Award: Outstanding Writing in a Children's Special (Franklin Thompson and Arthur Heinemann)

== Critical reception ==
Several psychologists have criticized the film for the outdated common belief that reversing letters in words is the central feature of dyslexia. A good aspect is that the film shows that dyslexia isn't an indicator of low mental ability and that many highly intelligent people have dyslexia, too.

US Magazine described the drama as slight but River Phoenix's portrayal as subtle and uncompromisingly real.

== See also ==
- List of artistic depictions of dyslexia
