= The Yards =

2000 American crime drama film by James Gray

- Theatrical release poster
- Directed by: James Gray
- Written by: James Gray; Matt Reeves
- Produced by: Nick Wechsler; Paul Webster; Kerry Orent
- Starring: Mark Wahlberg; Joaquin Phoenix; Charlize Theron; Faye Dunaway; Ellen Burstyn; James Caan
- Cinematography: Harris Savides
- Edited by: Jeffrey Ford
- Music by: Howard Shore
- Production company: Paul Webster/Industry Entertainment
- Distributed by: Miramax Films
- Release date: October 20, 2000
- Running time: 115 minutes
- Country: United States
- Language: English
- Budget: $24 million
- Box office: $2.28 million

The Yards is a 2000 American crime film directed by James Gray, written by Gray and Matt Reeves, and starring Mark Wahlberg, Joaquin Phoenix, Charlize Theron, Faye Dunaway, Ellen Burstyn and James Caan.

It is set in the commuter rail yards in New York City ("the yards"), specifically in the boroughs of the Bronx, Queens, and Brooklyn, where contractors repair railway cars for the city Transit Authority (TA). Bribery, corporate crime, and political corruption are commonplace, as rival companies sabotage each other's work to win bids, and the undercutting leads to murder.

== Plot ==
Leo Handler visits his mother Val's house in Queens, New York, where she throws a surprise party celebrating his parole. There he meets up with Willie Gutierrez, his cousin Erica Soltz's boyfriend, who thanks him for serving time in prison, implying that Leo had taken a fall for their gang of friends. Eager to support Val, who has a heart condition, Leo follows Willie's suggestion of working for Erica's stepfather, Frank Olchin. The next day, at the offices of his railway car repair company, the Electric Rail Corporation, in Maspeth, Frank offers to help finance Leo's studies during a 2-year machinist program. Needing work immediately, Leo asks if he could be allowed to join the company by working with Willie at accounts, as Willie had suggested at the party, but Frank declines. Willie commiserates with Leo that night at a nightclub, saying Frank also unsuccessfully tried to get him into a machinist program.

At Brooklyn Borough Hall, Willie explains the inherent corruption in the contract system for repair work on the subways. After a hearing to award contracts, Hector Gallardo, co-owner of the Puerto Rican-owned Weltech Corporation, a minority company, approaches Willie about leaving Frank's firm for his. Willie declines and instead brings Leo with him to Roosevelt Island, where he bribes an official charged with awarding contracts. One night, Willie brings Leo to the Sunnyside repair yards, where he and his crew sabotage Weltech's work, hoping to lower their quality rating and lessen their ability to get contracts. Leo is instructed to stand watch while the crew sabotages the train couplings. Willie enters yard master Elliot Gorwitz's office to pay him off with Knicks tickets, but is ordered to remove his crew from the tracks, as Gallardo has already brought him $2,000 in cash. Gorwitz activates the alarm, which draws police officer Jerry Rifkin to the scene. Terrified of potentially returning to prison, Leo attempts escape, but when Rifkin starts assaulting him with his night stick, Leo beats him into unconsciousness. As he escapes, he witnesses Willie fatally stabbing Gorwitz.

With Rifkin in a coma at a hospital, the crew orders Leo to murder him to prevent him from identifying Leo when he awakens, but Leo is unable to do it. Upon awakening, Rifkin identifies Leo as his attacker, triggering a broad manhunt. The police, assuming Leo also killed Gorwitz, raid Val's apartment, causing her to suffer from a near-fatal heart attack. Despite being instructed by Willie to keep a low profile, Leo emerges from hiding to visit a sick Val. While he is tending to her, Erica discovers Willie was with Leo at the yards and realizes he was the one who murdered Gorwitz, consequently ending her romantic relationship with him. Frank disowns Willie, who tries unsuccessfully to accept a deal offered to him earlier by Gallardo for protection.

Erica implores Frank to help, but instead Leo realizes that Frank is prepared to kill him. With no other options available, Leo desperately turns to Gallardo for protection. Accompanied by Gallardo's lawyers, Leo turns himself in at a public hearing into the rail yard incident and contract corruption. Realizing that Rifkin's testimony against Leo is in no one's interest, Frank and Gallardo negotiate a new split of the contracts with Queens Borough President Arthur Mydanick in a backroom deal. Willie visits Erica, wanting to reconcile with her, and disturbingly reveals to her that according to Frank, she and Leo had been in a romantic relationship when they were younger, and once were caught having sexual intercourse. Fearing his temper and jealousy, Erica triggers the silent house alarm. Willie frantically attempts to embrace her to avoid being exposed as unsuitable, but as she pulls away from him, he unintentionally throws her off the second floor landing to her death. Outside the house, he surrenders to the police, who have immediately responded to the alarm.

Police arrive at the hearing to inform Erica's mother Kitty and Frank of Erica's death. After Erica's funeral, Frank pulls Leo aside to promise help in the future, if he abstains from testifying at a hearing by the Attorney General, but Leo disgustedly rejects his offer. He ultimately testifies against Frank, Arthur, Willie, and the others involved in the political corruption surrounding The Yards, before departing from Queens on the elevated train.

== Cast ==
- Mark Wahlberg as Leo Handler
- Joaquin Phoenix as Willie Gutierrez
- Charlize Theron as Erica Soltz
- James Caan as Frank Olchin
- Ellen Burstyn as Val Handler
- Faye Dunaway as Kitty Olchin
- Steve Lawrence as Arthur Mydanick
- Tony Musante as Seymour Korman
- Victor Argo as Paul Lazarides
- Tomas Milian as Manuel Sequiera
- Robert Montano as Hector Gallardo
- Victor Arnold as Albert Granada
- Domenick Lombardozzi as Todd
- Joe Lisi as Elliot Gorwitz
- David Zayas as Officer Jerry Rifkin
- Joseph Ragno as Leo's parole officer
- Dan Grimaldi as Executive One
- Andy Davoli as Raymond Price

In addition, actual New York City-based news anchors Roma Torre, Lewis Dodley (as Louis Dodley), and Ernie Anastos play news anchors seen reporting on incidents in the film.

== Production ==
The film's director and co-screenwriter, James Gray, based the film on an actual corruption scandal in the mid-1980s, which involved his father. It was initially written for Fox Searchlight but Miramax took over production in 1996.

The New York City Transit Authority, known as the MTA, initially disallowed the production companies from filming at any of its yards because it believed the film negatively portrayed the agency.

Filming locations included Roosevelt Island, Maspeth and Elmhurst, Queens, the Bronx, and New Jersey. The railyard scenes were shot at the MTA's Inwood, Manhattan, 207th Street Yard and shop, as well as an abandoned freight yard in Brooklyn.

It was shot in the spring and summer of 1998 but – due to studio delays – not released until the fall of 2000.

== Reception ==
On the review aggregator website Rotten Tomatoes, the film has an approval rating of 64%, based on 96 reviews, with an average rating of 5.93/10. The website's consensus reads, "Featuring strong performances and direction, The Yards is a richly textured crime thriller with an authentic feel." Metacritic, which uses a weighted average, assigned the film a score of 58 out of 100, based on 31 critics, indicating "mixed or average" reviews.

=== Box office ===
On a relatively limited release, the film, which had a $24 million budget, took in just $889,352 in the United States and Canada, and $34,684 in Australia.

== Awards ==
Year	Award	Category	Title	Result
2000	National Board of Review Awards	Best Supporting Actor	Joaquin Phoenix	Won
2000	Cannes Film Festival	Golden Palm Nomination	James Gray	Nominated
2001	Broadcast Film Critics Association	Best Supporting Actor	Joaquin Phoenix	Won
