= Ricky Rodriguez =

American cult victim who murdered childhood sexual abuser (1975–2005)

- Rodriguez, c. 2000
- Born: David Moses Zerby; January 25, 1975; Tenerife, Canary Islands, Spain
- Died: January 9, 2005 (aged 29); Blythe, California, U.S.
- Cause of death: Suicide by gunshot
- Other name: Davidito
- Occupations: Fisherman, electrician
- Known for: Son of cult leader, perpetrator in murder–suicide
- Spouse: Elixcia Munumel (m. 1999)
- Parents: Karen Zerby (biological mother); David Berg (father)
- Criminal information
- Status: Deceased
- Motive: Revenge for childhood sexual abuse towards himself and others in The Family International cult

Details
- Date: January 8, 2005
- Location: Tucson, Arizona
- Targets: Karen Zerby (primarily, plot abandoned); Angela Smith
- Killed: 1 (Angela Smith)

Richard Peter Rodriguez (born David Moses Zerby; January 25, 1975 – January 9, 2005) was raised as the son of David Berg, the leader of a religious cult called The Family, formerly known as the Children of God (COG), who murdered one of his childhood sexual abusers, Angela M. Smith, and then died by suicide.

During Rodriguez's childhood, he and his biological mother Karen Zerby and her husband David Berg, the leaders of The Family, traveled across the world to convert followers. Berg believed Rodriguez was called upon to become a prophet during biblical End Times. From a young age Rodriguez was brought up in a heavily sexually abusive environment and was sexually abused and raped by numerous people, including a cohort of adult "nannies", as described in the Family-published document titled "The Davidito Book".

Despite leaving The Family and finding marriage, Rodriguez struggled to adjust to life outside the cult and sought revenge for his abuse. He left his wife in Tacoma, Washington, and traveled across the U.S. in an attempt to find Zerby. After learning his former nanny Angela M. Smith was in Tucson, Arizona, he stayed with people he knew there until he settled in an apartment. On January 7, 2005, he recorded a video, saying he needed to take retribution for abuse in The Family—including his own—alluding to murder. The next day, Rodriguez invited Smith to his apartment, where he murdered her by slitting her throat and stabbing her, before driving to Blythe, California, where he shot himself.

The Family urged its members to disregard news reports about Rodriguez and Smith, and a spokesperson for the group said reports neglected to show Smith as a victim. Another former member considered it, out of other suicides in the group, to be one of the worst moments in The Family's history, and noted that Rodriguez's accounts were corroborated with other victims' stories of abuse. Cult specialist Rick Alan Ross described his suicide as reflective of the cult's many individuals who suffered in "one of the most horrifically abusive and destructive cults in American history".

== Early life ==
Richard Peter Rodriguez was born on January 25, 1975, in Tenerife, Canary Islands, Spain, as David Moses Zerby. His mother was Karen Zerby, the spiritual leader of the religious cult Children of God (COG), and his father was a Spanish hotel waiter named Carlos whom Zerby had "Flirty Fished", a practice in which female cult members would have sex with men to draw in potential converts. Rodriguez was unofficially adopted by David Berg, the group's founder and Zerby's husband, and was given the nickname "Davidito" and often referred to as "the prince". Rodriguez's legal name was changed multiple times as he traveled across the world with Berg and Zerby as missionaries; however, no official adoption by Berg ever took place, and young female members of the group known as "nannies" were tasked with raising him. These "nannies" often subjected young Rodriguez to sexual abuse, with such abuse being documented and later compiled into a book called "The Story of Davidito". He was also raised alongside Techi, Zerby's daughter.

On May 2, 1978, Berg declared in a publication that Rodriguez and Zerby would one day have the power to "call down fire from Heaven and devour their enemies". He also predicted they would both be killed and raised from the dead "3 1/2 days" later, and Rodriguez would go on to guide followers as a prophet during biblical End Times. Many who knew Rodriguez said he grew shy and uncomfortable around group members because his status as a supposed prophet made him prominent.

=== Sexual abuse and aftermath ===
Rodriguez's sexual abuse at the instruction of COG leaders began when he was a toddler. While growing up in the COG, Rodriguez was frequently exposed to adults engaging in sexual intercourse at Berg's home as part of the group members' sexual "sharing". When he was ten months old, Zerby and Berg asked Sara, one of Rodriguez's nannies, to start creating a document titled "The Davidito Book" (also referred to as "The Story of Davidito"). The book contains descriptions of adults sexually molesting the child Rodriguez, describing this abuse in a "celebratory" tone. Most of this material was previously sent out to members in the form of pamphlets called Davidito letters.

The 762-page document included photos of Rodriguez with naked teenage girls and being present during the group's orgies. One of his nannies, Angela M. Smith, who was also Zerby's personal secretary, was included in the photos, in one of which she is undoing his pants; the picture is captioned "Undressing ... for Sue!" (Smith). The material also contained captions and text written by Berg commenting on the situation in a sexual manner. Berg later ordered "Davidito" and similar documents that had been created to be purged or references to sex removed, but former members were able to establish its existence by distributing the material via email.

Davida Kelley, who lived with Berg from the age of 13, said Rodriguez was sexually abused "[by] all the adult women. Most of them, at least", including Zerby. According to an article by the Los Angeles Times, Berg reportedly had sex with numerous female members of the group; in an effort to prepare Rodriguez to do the same when he became leader, he was put into "teen training," in which he would have sex with multiple older teenage females every afternoon.

In 1986, the COG, which was now called The Family (eff. 1978), banned adult sex with (i.e., rape of) minors along with Flirty Fishing. Berg died in 1994, and Zerby, alongside her then-husband Peter Amsterdam, took full leadership of the cult. A British court, headed by Lord Justice Ward, issued a verdict during an investigation related to a 1995 trial, stating that the Davidito book was an example of Berg's promotion of pedophilia within the group, and that the leadership considered it a guidebook for adult–child relationships. Amsterdam, as ordered by Ward, distanced The Family from Berg's writings on child upbringing.

== Adult life ==
=== Departure from The Family ===
In 1996, at 21 years old, Rodriguez moved to a Family-owned home in Budapest, Hungary, where he met his girlfriend Elixcia Munumel, who returned with him to Zerby's home in Porto, Portugal, and lived with him there. In 1999, the couple told Zerby they were going to The Family's compound in Mexico, but instead Munumel went to England and Rodriguez went to the United States. Rodriguez stayed at the not-for-profit charity The Family Care Foundation's headquarters in Dulzura, San Diego, California. He sold a car Zerby had given him so Munumel could meet him in Tacoma, Washington. Rodriguez and Munumel married in a minister's home. According to Munumel, they struggled with finances and experience in the outside world, and moved into a low-rent apartment. Rodriguez took a job on a fishing boat in Alaska, began to take knife-based martial arts lessons, and spent time at a shooting range while trying to obtain a gun permit.

=== Resentment towards Family leaders ===
According to The Family, Rodriguez officially left the cult to pursue his education and he remained on good terms with it. According to Munumel, however, when they first met in Budapest, Rodriguez began having reservations about Berg's teachings, which noticeably contradicted the Bible, and expressed his frustrations to her about the group as a whole. She said he heard stories from former members and carried guilt because of his position as a future leader of The Family, which he felt contributed to the abuse of other children. Rodriguez' friend Celeste Jones also said he felt angry because there was no justice to apprehend abusers in The Family and that he pretended that he was not angry around members of the group; according to the Tucson Citizen, however, Rodriguez became more vocal around the time he started talking to former members.

In 2002, Rodriguez made a post on the website "Moving On" accusing Berg of abusing his own daughters and granddaughter in the Philippines, and describing Zerby as apathetic and violent towards her children. He also mentioned his teen training in most of his posts on the site. Ex-member Sarah Martin, who corresponded with Rodriguez through the site, said that because he felt responsible for preventing the abuse of others in the cult, he was carrying a large burden, never got over the Davidito prophecy, and felt he had a need to put an end to Zerby's abuse. Rodriguez also said he thought about suicide since his teen training and hoped the group's leaders' legacy and control over The Family would end. In a similar 2004 post, Rodriguez said he realized he could never move on with his life because the first 25 years of abuse would always haunt him. At the end of his post, he asked those who had "nothing to lose" to help him with a plot for revenge. Rodriguez further told his martial arts teacher, Kevin Schmitt, he had considered murdering members of The Family in the past. Rodriguez's friend, ex-member Daniel Nathan Roselle, advised taking legal action, but he was mostly concerned with finding Zerby and Amsterdam.

== Search for Zerby and murder-suicide ==
Zerby, and other Family members, had their locations isolated and their names kept secret with pseudonyms. Rodriguez, according to Munumel, spent years trying to find Zerby and his half-sister, Techi, whom he wanted to take out of The Family. In summer of 2004, Rodriguez left Munumel. Later, they both separated, but according to her they continued to talk "every day". Rodriguez traveled to San Diego, where he met Martin in person.

Rodriguez learned that Smith was serving on the board of The Family Care Foundation and was a member of Elderhaven, a nursing home in Tucson, Arizona, run by Rodriguez' grandparents. According to a statement made later by Munumel, Rodriguez also learned that Zerby and Techi were going to visit his grandparents at Elderhaven during Christmas of 2003. He subsequently came to Tucson and stayed with the family of his aunt, Rosemary Kanspedos, for a month. He received a job as an electrician, never divulging the details of his prior life to his boss or his wife.

Sometime before 2005, Rodriguez moved into an apartment on Tucson's North Side. On January 7, of that year, Rodriguez recorded a videotape in which he discussed his thoughts of suicide and his desire for revenge, describing himself as a vigilante. He presented numerous weapons including a Glock 23 pistol, a KA-BAR knife, a drill, a soldering iron, and duct tape, some of which he planned to use for torture. Rodriguez specifically named Zerby as his target, stating that if he did not find her before he died, he would keep hunting her in the next life or someone else would "pick up the torch". Rodriguez alluded to Smith as a person he intended to kill and predicted his upcoming actions would result in conflict with law enforcement, but insisted he intended no harm towards law enforcement. After recording the video, Rodriguez called Celeste Jones and told her of his suicidal thoughts. She encouraged him to testify in a legal case and said "things will be taken seriously". He replied that he did not believe her. Rodriguez sent copies of the video to Munumel, two of his family members, and Martin.

The next day, Rodriguez invited Smith to dinner in his apartment. After she arrived, Rodriguez stabbed her several times in the arm then slit her throat. Rodriguez then left his apartment and drove to Blythe, California, where he arrived at midnight. He rented a motel room and began to call his family members in Lakewood, Washington, notifying them of a body in his apartment. Next, Rodriguez pulled into a parking lot near 14th Avenue, called Munumel, told her he had killed Smith, and asked her to call the police. He also told Munumel he had killed Smith to avenge his sister Techi and those still in The Family rather than himself. He said Smith "didn't understand what she had done wrong" as she was dying. Rodriguez called the murder "the hardest thing I ever did in my life" and said it did not make him feel better. Munumel claims that Rodriguez pleaded with her to die by suicide with him, then said goodbye to her and hung up. At roughly 2 a.m., Rodriguez shot himself in the head with his handgun.

=== Investigation and memorial ===
At 8 a.m., a Palo Verde Irrigation District employee discovered Rodriguez' body in his car and contacted local police. The investigating detective thought Rodriguez had simply died by suicide, but answered Munumel's call to Rodriguez' cell phone and learned of the murder from her. Blythe police then notified the Tucson Police Department officers of Smith's body in Rodriguez' apartment. Aside from his video, Rodriguez left no suicide note. Detective Sgt. Mark Fuller, who was in charge of the homicide investigation, assumed Rodriguez had killed Smith because she was responsible for his abuse; but because of scant details about her involvement in his childhood, authorities initially could not ascertain the real motive. According to police, there was no evidence Smith was tortured for information on the whereabouts of Zerby. Tucson police spokesman Sgt. Carlos Valdez said Smith died shortly before her body was recovered and that Rodriguez had left for Blythe twelve hours prior. Smith's birth name was Susan Joy Kauten; her name-change would have delayed the notification of her death to her family had she not been carrying her cell phone, which gave her birth name.

A memorial for Rodriguez was held in San Diego on March 26, 2005. In her eulogy, Munumel said while Rodriguez "chose a path that no one could share with him", he knew she loved him. More than 100 people who had been formerly associated with The Family attended the service.

== Response to murder–suicide ==
=== Researchers, ex-members, and outsiders ===
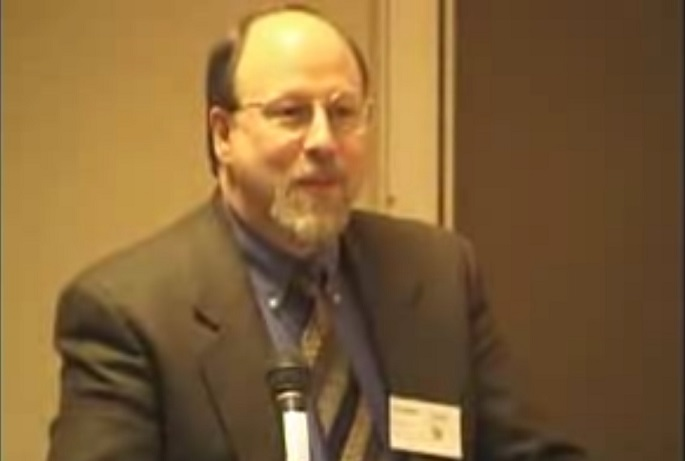
Canadian Professor of Sociology Stephen A. Kent considered why Rodriguez was led to murder Smith, which he believed was exacerbated by his lack of justice for his abuse.

Stephen A. Kent, a professor in the Department of Sociology at the University of Alberta, said while Rodriguez was unjustifiable in the murder, one "can understand his frustration and rage" because "he and others from that generation" had never seen justice or resolve "from all the abuse they suffered". Rick Alan Ross, a cult researcher who had interviewed numerous former members of The Family, noted that Rodriguez reflected the many suicides of those who suffered a "tremendous amount of pain" from being in "one of the most horrifically abusive and destructive cults in American history". Don Lattin, a journalist and author who spent two years studying Rodriguez' motives for the murder, published a book called Jesus Freaks. He believed Rodriguez was a "time bomb" waiting to go off because he exhibited aggressive tendencies and expressed guilt for other victims' abuse. According to Lattin, former members were further frustrated that the abuse was not accounted for because "there's a statute of limitations. A lot of this happened a long time ago outside of the U.S. by people who kept constantly changing their names ... So even the victims, the kids themselves, often don't know who abused them".

Roselle was in mourning after Rodriguez's death, and regretted that the murder-suicide took place. He expressed his frustration with the lack of support for sexual abuse victims of the cult prior to the murder, and believed that "the only way anybody's listening" to the stories of abuse "is that Rick and Angela died". He also said Rodriguez' suicide brought the total of suicides in his peer group to 30, but that he considered Rodriguez' abuse to be one of the worst cases from The Family. John LaMattery, a former second-generation leader, said Rodriguez' death was "a monumental event" in The Family's history and predicted that the group would "spin it" in an attempt to disregard unfulfilled prophecies and attempt "damage control". He also believed Rodriguez killed Smith because he could not find Zerby.

After Rodriguez' death, former members of The Family made similar allegations of abuse. For example, Juliana Buhring, sister of Celeste Jones and co-author of the book Not Without My Sister (which details their family's experiences within the cult), mentioned that most of the children she and people like Rodriguez grew up with in the cult were sexually abused. She empathized with the rage he felt, especially when he had "no closure" and "no restitution" for it.

Numerous members of the website "Moving On" expressed their concerns about the incident. Editors of the website described the situation as "a horrible tragedy, and something that we sincerely hope is never repeated". Staff at Palo Alto's Restoration Hardware, Smith's workplace, remembered her as a kind person; her boss stated, "There was nothing creepy about Angela". The non-profit Safe Passage Foundation was established partially as a result of Rodriguez' suicide in an aim to protect minors from "high-demand organisations" and to provide them with support and resources to leave those groups.

=== The Family ===
In an internal memo, Zerby told followers of The Family that reporters were trying to "make Ricky look like a hero and role model" rather than a perpetrator of a crime. In another memo, which was sent to an estimated 12,000 followers, Amsterdam urged followers to disregard media reports and internet news about the murder-suicide and said Rodriguez was "overcome by the enemy and forces of darkness" and that Zerby is "the sweetest, most loving person I know". He also said people were "exploiting this tragedy" to hurt him, Zerby, and The Family in an effort to "tear down our work for the Lord". Techi stated in a letter she became "deeply disturbed" after learning about Rodriguez's death, and that he was not an angry person when she knew him. The Ricky Rodriguez Memorial Site (RickyRodriguez.com), which was managed by The Family, included "never before published photos" of Zerby and "messages from Jesus". The site was not renewed and does not exist anymore.

Claire Borowik, the spokesperson for The Family, said both deaths were tragic but that media reports portrayed Smith as an offender and Rodriguez as a victim. She said Smith was never Rodriguez' nanny but had only visited him and that The Family gave him "ample financial and emotional support" when he wanted to become independent. Borowik also compared Rodriguez' upbringing to one in "a nudist colony" and cited scholars who argue sexual practices similar to those of The Family do not harm children. In regards to the "Davidito" prophecy, Borowik said The Family "knew that Davidito wasn't fulfilling that prophecy" because prophecies of the group were always "dependent on man's choices". Borowik also said former members, whom she called apostates, failed to move Rodriguez in "positive directions" and wanted "to do damage to our movement". She criticized Lattin's book for "inaccuracies, misconceptions and erroneous conclusions", and "sketchy research".

== In media ==
- British documentary series Cutting Edge's episode "Cult Killer" is about Rodriguez' story leading up to the murder.
- Lattin's book Jesus Freaks: A True Story of Murder and Madness on the Evangelical Edge recounts the events of Rodriguez' life in a story-like setting.
- HBO's documentary Children of God: Lost and Found, which is about The Family and was directed by former member Noah Thomson, includes footage from Rodriguez' video.
- "Sects", the 19th episode of Law & Order's 15th season, is loosely based on Ricky Rodriguez and The Children of God.

== See also ==
- List of anti-sex offender attacks in the United States
- Killing of Jeffrey Doucet, the shooting death of a man arrested for kidnapping and raping the shooter's son
- Assassination of Shinzo Abe, anti-cult motivated assassination of former Prime Minister of Japan
