= List of anti-sex offender attacks in the United States =

This is a list of anti-sex offender attacks in the United States.

== Background ==
In the United States, attacks against sex offenders have been facilitated by federal and state laws regarding sex offender registration and notification, which require sex offenders to disclose their identities and addresses to the public. Such attacks have been shown to extend to family members of sex offenders, as well as people falsely accused of being sex offenders.

A study reported that 15% of sex offenders in the country have been attacked since their crimes were made public, with one-third having received violent threats. Another study reported that 16% have been physically assaulted due to their registration. A database of anti-sex offender attacks included 279 fatal and non-fatal incidents from 1983 to 2015, with 5% of victims being people falsely accused of being sex offenders. An investigation by The New York Times reported 170 video-recorded attacks against people accused of sexual crimes from 2023 to 2025, many of which perpetrated by organized vigilante groups.

== Fatal attacks ==
Victim(s)	Date	Location	Description	Reference(s)
Jeffrey Doucet	March 1984	Baton Rouge, Louisiana	Doucet was shot and killed by Gary Plauché, the father of the 12-year-old boy whom he had kidnapped and raped. Plauché pleaded guilty to manslaughter and was sentenced to five years of probation.	
Daniel Driver	April 1993	Jamestown, California	Driver was shot dead by Ellie Nesler during his trial for allegedly molesting Nesler's son. Nesler pleaded guilty to manslaughter and was sentenced to 10 years in prison.	
John Geoghan	August 2003	Shirley, Massachusetts	Geoghan was beaten to death by Joseph Druce while imprisoned for assaulting a ten-year-old boy. Druce, who was already serving a life sentence for murder, was convicted of first degree murder and received another life sentence.	
John Jasmer	August, 2003	Seattle, Washington	Two teenage boys killed John Jasmer after they claimed that Jasmer raped a girl. They were sentenced to 27.5 years in prison for murder of Jasmer.	
Richard Ausley	January 2004	Waverly, Virginia	Ausley was beaten and strangled by his cellmate, Dewey Keith Venable, while imprisoned for abusing a teenage boy in 1972. Ausley was previously notorious as the kidnapper and rapist of Paul Martin Andrews. Venable, who had been molested as a child, pleaded guilty to second degree murder and had 12.5 years added to his sentence.	
Angela Smith	January 2005	Tucson, Arizona	Smith was a former member of The Family International. She was killed by Ricky Rodriguez, another former member who she had raped as a child.	
Victor Vazquez	August 2005	Bellingham, Washington	Vasquez and Eisses were killed by Michael Mullen. Mullen used a sex offender registry to find the home where Vasquez and Eisses lived with a roommate, also a sex offender, and posed as an FBI agent to gain entry. Mullen pleaded guilty to second degree murder and was sentenced to 44 years in prison. He died in prison in 2008.	
Hank Eisses	August 2005	Bellingham, Washington	Vasquez and Eisses were killed by Michael Mullen. Mullen used a sex offender registry to find the home where Vasquez and Eisses lived with a roommate, also a sex offender, and posed as an FBI agent to gain entry. Mullen pleaded guilty to second degree murder and was sentenced to 44 years in prison. He died in prison in 2008.	
Justin Huff	January 2006	Virginia Beach, Virginia	Former Navy Officer Cooper Jackson was convicted of murder when he killed an active member of the marines, Justin Huff. According to Cooper Jackson, he claimed to have killed Justin Huff based on an allegation that he gang raped a woman. Except the allegation never took place when it was revealed in the trial.	
William Elliott	April 2006	Milo, Maine	Elliott and Gray were killed by Stephen Alexander Marshall. Marshall used Maine's sex offender registry to locate and murder Elliott and Gray, as they were registered sex offenders. Marshall later committed suicide after being apprehended by authorities for the attacks.	
Joseph Gray	April 2006	Corinth, Maine	Elliott and Gray were killed by Stephen Alexander Marshall. Marshall used Maine's sex offender registry to locate and murder Elliott and Gray, as they were registered sex offenders. Marshall later committed suicide after being apprehended by authorities for the attacks.	
Melissa Chandler	September 2007	Helenwood, Tennessee	Melissa Chandler was accidentally killed after neighbours Robert Bell and Gary Sellers set her house on fire in an attempt to intimidate her husband, Timothy. Timothy had been arrested for child pornography and was out on bond at the time of the fire. Bell pleaded guilty to second degree murder and was sentenced to 25 years in prison.	
Michael Dodele	November 2007	Lakeport, California	Ivan Garcia Oliver stabbed his neighbour, registered sex offender Michael Dodele, to death 35 days after Dodele was released from prison. Oliver, the father of a child molestation victim, believed he was protecting his son. Ivan Garcia Oliver was sentenced to 32 years to life.	
Daniel Sorenson	November 2007	Wayne County, Michigan	Two teenage boys, Jean Pierre Orlewicz and Alex Letkemann, were accused of beheading Daniel Sorenson in a garage over a drug deal, but Sorenson's history of being a sex offender was initially used by the teen boys to justify his death. Orlewicz is serving a life sentence for the murder of Sorenson and Letkemann is serving a 20-30 sentence for second degree murder in the case.	,.
Darrell McNeill	February 2009	Mendocino County, California	Darrell McNeill was killed by Aaron Vargas after Vargas accused him of child molestation. McNeill was shot to death during the confrontation. Vargas was sentenced to a decade in prison for the murder.	
Jamar Pinkney Jr.	November 2009	Detroit, Michigan	Murdered by his father, Jamar Pinkney Sr., after confessing to molesting his 3-year-old sister. Pinkney Sr. was convicted of second degree murder and sentenced to 37 to 80 years in prison.	
Mark A. Gabler	April 2010	Bexar County, Texas	Shawn Phillips, Kenneth Nelsen, and Richelle Vasquez, together with Michael Sorrell—who is alleged to have participated—beat Gabler to death with a club after a family member accused him of sexually assaulting Phillips's 7-year-old female relative.	
Bobby Rainwater Jr.	December 2011	San Juan Capistrano, California	Stabbed to death outside his home. Rainwater had previously served a sentence of 9 years for felony assault with intent to rape. A neighbor, Robert Eugene Vasquez, suspected Rainwater was a child molester. This led to Vasquez ambushing and killing Rainwater. Vasquez was sentenced to life without the possibility of parole for the murder.	
Jerry Wayne Ray	June 2012	Sequim, Washington	Patrick Drum murdered two sex offenders known to him, including his roommate. He pleaded guilty to two counts of aggravated first degree murder and was sentenced to life in prison without parole.	
Gary Lee Blanton	June 2012	Sequim, Washington	Patrick Drum murdered two sex offenders known to him, including his roommate. He pleaded guilty to two counts of aggravated first degree murder and was sentenced to life in prison without parole.	
Charles Parker	July 2013	Union County, South Carolina	Two Neo-Nazis, Jeremy and Christine Moody, used a sex offender registry to kill a sex offender and his wife. The two pleaded guilty to murder and were sentenced to life in prison without parole.	
Gretchen Parker	July 2013	Union County, South Carolina	Two Neo-Nazis, Jeremy and Christine Moody, used a sex offender registry to kill a sex offender and his wife. The two pleaded guilty to murder and were sentenced to life in prison without parole.	
Norris Acosta Sanchez	October 2013	Orange County, New York	Norris Acosta-Sanchez was listed as a fugitive accused of rape when he confronted David Carlson, who was armed with a shotgun. A struggle took place in which Calson fired several times. David Carlson was subsequently acquitted in 2020.	,.
Micah Boland	February 2014	Warren, Maine	Boland, an inmate at Maine State Prison, was serving 22 years for assaulting a 4-year-old girl when he was stabbed to death by fellow prisoner Richard Stahursky. Stahursky, who was originally serving a sentence for armed robbery, was sentenced to life in prison without parole.	
Raymond Earl Brooks	June 2014	Berlin, Alabama	A 43-year-old man killed Brooks, a convicted sex offender that had pleaded guilty to sexually abusing his attacker's daughter in 2002.	
Robert Noce Jr.	July 2015	Baton Rouge, Louisiana	Jace Crehan, along with his fiancée Brittany Monk, strangled Noce and left his body in a barrel. Robert Noce had previously been convicted of molesting Monk.	
David Haiman	June 2016	Grand Rapids, Minnesota	Joseph Thorensen accused David Haiman of raping his girlfriend. The confrontation lead to the torture and decapitation of Haiman. In a subsequent investigation, Joseph Thorensen was accused of being on meth at the time of the killings. He is serving a life sentence for murder.	
Alanaokala Solomon Covington	October 2016	Kailua-Kona, Hawaii	Covington was shot to death when Gafatasi Napoleon heard allegations that Covington was sexually assaulting women in a homeless camp. Gafatasi Napoleon wrote graffiti about the killing with the justification being punishment for raping women. Gafatasi Napoleon was convicted of manslaughter in 2017.	
John Haig Marshall	November 2017	Redondo Beach, California	Four men were arrested and charged for killing John Haig Marshall, a 61-year-old registered sex offender, during a home-invasion robbery in Redondo Beach.	
John Capparelli	March 2019	Las Vegas, Nevada	Derrick Decoste murdered Capparelli, a former Catholic priest accused of child molestation. Decoste was sentenced to 45 years in prison in 2023.	
Mattieo Condoluci	May 2020	Omaha, Nebraska	James Fairbanks shot Condoluci 7 times in his home. Fairbanks claimed that he had witnessed Condoluci, a registered sex offender, watching children play from his driveway.	
Andrew Sorensen	November 2020	Spokane, Washington	Andrew Sorensen was falsely accused of sex trafficking by John Eisenman and Brenda Kross. They tortured him after claiming Sorensen sex trafficked their daughter. Sorensen was reported missing for a year. Once the body was found, Eisenman and Kross were convicted of murder and are sentenced from 8 to 25 years.	
Charles Luitze	November 2020	Kenosha, Wisconsin	Bryan Luitze II beat his grandfather to death with a hammer after discovering he was a convicted sex offender.	
Gabriel Quintanilla	January 2022	Hidalgo County, Texas	The three teens, Christian Treviño, his brother Alejandro Treviño, and their friend Juan Eduardo Melendez beat Christian and Alejandro's stepfather, Gabriel Quintanilla, to death after accusations that he had sexually abused the brothers' 9-year-old half-sister. In October 2025, Christian pleaded guilty and was sentenced to 10 years in prison.	
Daxcimo Ceja	April 2022	Colorado Springs, Colorado	Deka Simmons shot Ceja, a wanted unregistered sex offender, dismembered his corpse, and disposed of his body in a drainage ditch.	
Lawrence Scully	March 2023	Grand Marais, Minnesota	Scully was killed with a shovel and a moose antler. The killer, Levi Axtell, had previously accused Scully of stalking his daughter. In 2025, a judge ruled that Axtell was incompetent to stand trial because he suffered from ongoing delusions. A trial is pending as of 2026.	
Sean Showers	May 2023	Houston, Texas	James Lewis Spencer III pretended to be a minor in order to lure Showers, an unregistered sex offender who had previously been incarcerated for possession of child pornography, to his location, where he shot him several times. Spencer, who allegedly believed that police were not doing enough to keep pedophiles incarcerated, was arrested and charged in January 2024.	
Gerald Fox	April 2024	Spokane, Washington	Gerald Fox was killed when Alyssa Bray ran him over with his truck. Gerald Fox was accused of child pornography at the time of his death. Bray alleges that Fox tried to initiate sexual contact with her.	
Michael Fosler	October 2024	Lonoke County, Arkansas	Fosler, an accused sex offender, was shot to death by Aaron Spencer, the father of one of Fosler's accusers. Fosler was accused of rape the time of his death. Murder charges were dropped against Aaron in June 2026 due to the mishandling and disappearance of an SD card from a dash cam in Fosler's car.	
Thorne Harnage, Donald Lashley,Saul Alvarez and Joseph Desisto,	Novenber 2024 - April 2025	Arizona State Prison Complex – Tucson	Ricky Wassenaar claimed to have killed 4 sex offenders in prison out of hatred of Child Sex offenders in prison. Note Wassenaar is being tried for three of the deaths and a trial pending as of 2026.	,,
Allen Cogswell	June 2025	Elkhart, Indiana	Nicholas Stanley shot and killed Allen Cogswell at a hotel in Elkhart. Cogswell was a registered sex offender who had been released from prison a month earlier after abusing someone in Stanley's family.	
David Brimmer	September 2025	Fremont, California	Varun Saresh attacked Brimmer with a knife, resulting in an altercation that ended with Saresh slitting Brimmer's throat. Saresh had disguised himself as an accountant and attempted to appear non-threatening prior to the attack.	
Colie Lee Daniel	March 2026	Palm Bay, Florida	Daniel was murdered and his chopped-up remains were distributed amongst two suitcases. The killer, Lucas Sander Jones, had used a list of sex offenders from a law enforcement database to find Daniel. Jones is currently in prison for first degree murder and tampering with a dead body.	
Robert George Locke	May, 2026	Collegedale, Tennessee	Kian Andrew Neal, an 18-year-old from Apison, Tennessee, was arrested on June 12, 2026, and charged in connection with Locke's death. Neal pleaded not guilty.	
Arron Christopher Warren	November 7, 2026	Bullhead City, Arizona	Jacob Dylan Middlebrook, 35, and Layne Justine McIntosh, 36 are named as a persons of interest over the murder of Arron Christopher Warren. Note the couple allegedly stated their hatred of sex offenders during a police interview. Note this is under investigation as of November 2026.	,

== Non-fatal attacks ==
Attacker(s)	Date	Location	Description	Reference(s)
Kenneth J. Kerekes Sr.	1995	Phillipsburg, New Jersey	Kerekes Sr. and Kerekes Jr., notified through Megan's Law of the presence of a sex offender in a community, broke into his house and attacked a man they mistook for the sex offender.	
Kenneth J. Kerekes Jr.	1995	Phillipsburg, New Jersey	Kerekes Sr. and Kerekes Jr., notified through Megan's Law of the presence of a sex offender in a community, broke into his house and attacked a man they mistook for the sex offender.	
James Johnson	June 1998	Linden, New Jersey	Johnson fired bullets at the house of a sex offender.	
Lawrence Trant	2003	Concord, New Hampshire	Trant attempted to kill two sex offenders he had found using a government registry.	
William Lynch	2010	San Jose, California	Lynch attacked a Catholic Priest he accused of raping him. He was acquitted in 2012.	
Bonita Lynn Vela	December 2013	Franklin, Indiana	Vela held her daughter's boyfriend prisoner in her trailer for several hours and cut his penis with a box cutter after accusing him of molesting her son. She pleaded guilty to battery and was sentenced to home confinement.	
Steven Nigg	January 2016	Federal Correctional Institution, Englewood	Steven Nigg violently beat Jared Fogle, who was serving a 15-year prison sentence for distributing child pornography.	
Jason Vukovich	June 2016	Anchorage, Alaska	Vukovich used the sex offender registry to assault and rob three victims. Vukovich was sentenced to 28 years in prison with 5 years suspended. He was released in 2025.	
Cain Velasquez	February 2022	Santa Clara County, California	Former professional mixed martial artist, Cain Velasquez, pursued and attempted to shoot Harry Goularte Jr., who was arrested for allegedly sexually abusing Velasquez's son at a daycare owned by Goularte's family before being released on bond. Velasquez was arrested and sentenced to five years in prison and four years of supervised probation with eligibility for parole in March 2026.	
Elijah Cruz Valenzuela	August 2025	Portland, Oregon	Valenzuela attacked and stabbed a man he accused of showing him child pornography. He then called the police and turned himself in. He was sentenced to 5 years in prison.	
Thad Gurule	December 2025	Carbon County, Utah	Thad Gurule stabbed a man he accused of being a sex offender and making lewd comments about his daughter 17 times. Gurule has a pending case as of 2026.	

== See also ==
- Vigilantism in the United States
