= Plauché =

Plauché, or Plauche, is a French-language surname. It may refer to:

- Gary Plauché (1945–2014), American father who avenged the kidnapping and sexual assault of his son by shooting Jeffrey Doucet in the head.
- Jean Baptiste Plauché (1785–1860), Louisiana soldier and politician
- Vance Plauché (1897–1976), American politician, attorney, member of United States House of Representatives
