= Oprahization =

Neologism

Oprahization, sometimes spelled Oprah-ization or Oprahtization, is a neologism that refers to an increased sensitivity towards self-disclosure, particularly from victims of abuse or other tragedies. The term takes its name from The Oprah Winfrey Show, in which the eponymous host Oprah Winfrey often uses "extraordinary empathic skills in extracting self-disclosures and gut-wrenching confessions from her guests." In the context of politics, Oprahization refers to the tendency for politicians to discuss the ways in which they and their families have suffered, thereby "endearing the candidate to the nation as a man of sensitivity and caring." In the context of law, Oprahization refers to the tendency for juries to acquit or impose reduced sentences upon those defendants who have been victimized in some way, even when there is compelling evidence of guilt.

== Background ==
Numerous episodes of The Oprah Winfrey Show feature interviews with guests who have committed crimes or other delinquent behavior. Winfrey discusses the ways in which her guests have been victimized prior to their crimes, often in search of a reason why the crime was committed other than malicious intent. In one episode, titled How Far Would You Go?, Winfrey interviewed Ellie Nesler, who had shot and killed a man who was on trial for sexually molesting Nesler's son William. Nesler explained that, because it did not seem likely that the trial would end in a conviction, she killed him to prevent him from sodomizing other children. William, who was also featured on the show, revealed that he had received death threats from him after the abuse, and went on to state that he felt much safer with Dryver dead.

== Politics ==
The Oprahization of politics refers to the tendency for politicians to characterize themselves as having lived a life of suffering and tragedy as a means of appealing to the emotions of voters. This was embodied by the phrase "I feel your pain", used by Bill Clinton during the 1992 United States Presidential Election. Other examples include Clinton's sharing of his life with an abusive and alcoholic stepfather, Al Gore's references to his son's car accident and sister's lung cancer, and House Representative Dick Gephardt's frequent recollection of weathering his son's childhood cancer as proof that he was committed to universal health care.

While the Oprahization of politics is generally discussed within the context of the United States, it has also manifested itself in the United Kingdom.

== Law ==
The Oprahization of law refers to the tendency for jury members to acquit or reduce sentences on the basis of the defendant's previous history of victimization. One 1999 research study found strong support for the theory that exposure to crime-mitigating programs such as The Oprah Winfrey Show results in significantly lower punitive recommendations from juries. Prosecutors and professional jury consultants contend that potential jurors who are talk show watchers are generally distrustful of official accounts of the truth.

== Other uses ==
The term "Oprahization of America" has also been applied to the general impact that Oprah Winfrey has had on American culture, fashion and mores.

Another usage echoed by paleoconservative pundits refers to the impact of Oprah (and similar talk-show stars) upon American subculture, particularly women. It is lamentable to them that women embrace what they perceive as glib new age fads, cultural relativism under the ambit of multiculturalism, subtle misandry masquerading behind feminism, a subculture of self-victimization and vanity, which they attribute to Oprah.

== Sources ==
- Gregory, S. S.; et al. (6 June 1994). "Oprah! Oprah in the Court!". Time Magazine. Archived from the original on June 29, 2011.
- Hill, John R. & Zillmann, Dolf (Winter 1999). "The Oprahization of America: Sympathetic Crime Talk and Leniency". Journal of Broadcasting & Electronic Media. 43 (1): 67–82. doi:10.1080/08838159909364475.
- Kuypers, Jim A.; et al. (Summer 2003). "Compassionate Conservatism: The Rhetorical Reconstruction of Conservative Rhetoric" (PDF). American Communication Journal. 6 (4). Archived from the original (PDF) on June 20, 2006.
- Krauthammer, Charles (10 August 1992). "The Pornography of Self-Revelation". Time Magazine. Archived from the original on June 29, 2011.
