= Murder of Mattieo Condoluci =

2020 murder case in Nebraska, United States

- Location: Omaha, Nebraska, U.S.
- Date: May 14, 2020; 6 years ago
- Attack type: Homicide by shooting
- Victims: Mattieo Condoluci, aged 64
- Perpetrator: James Fairbanks
- Convictions: Second degree murder
- Sentence: 40 to 65 years imprisonment

On May 14, 2020, Mattieo Condoluci, a convicted sex offender, was murdered by James Fairbanks in Omaha, Nebraska, United States. Fairbanks had arrived at his house, and shot Condoluci seven times. After the killing, public opinion was divided. Some people claimed that Condoluci's murder was not justified, and other people expressed their support for Fairbanks. Condoluci's murder sparked debate over violence and intimidation against registered sex offenders, and the role of moral panic in enabling it. Several copycat killings against registered offenders ensued following Condoluci's murder.

== Background ==
=== Mattieo Condoluci ===
Mattieo Condoluci (1955-2020) worked as a security officer and was known for molesting 2 children. One in 1994 where he molested a 5-year old boy in Florida and in 2007, a 13-year old girl. He served 5 years in prison for the 1994 case and 2 years for the 2007 case. Condoluci also domestically abused and raped his daughter, Amanda Henry during her early childhood to teen years which led to Henry having post-traumatic-stress-disorder (PTSD) because of it. He also worked as a nightclub bouncer before his job as a security officer. Condoluci was a registered sex offender.

=== James Fairbanks ===
James Fairbanks (born October 25, 1976) was a school teacher who had been divorced and was a father of two.

== Murder ==
On May 14, 2020, Fairbanks had gone to Condoluci's house armed with a handgun. His intent was to intimidate Condoluci after he saw him watching kids play from his driveway. Condoluci answered the door, and Fairbanks began to threaten him, however he claimed Condoluci was advancing on him, and he opened fire. One bullet pierced his forehead, and other bullets shot his back and chest. Overall, Condoluci was shot seven times. After the killing, Fairbanks anonymously sent a letter to the KMTV news station, confessing to the crime.

== Legal proceedings ==
Fairbanks pleaded no contest to second degree murder. On July 14, 2021, he was sentenced to 40–65 years in prison. Fairbanks is serving his sentence at the Nebraska State Penitentiary. Under Nebraska good time laws, he will become eligible for parole on May 18, 2040, and has a mandatory release date of August 22, 2052.

== Aftermath ==
=== Reactions within family ===
While not excusing his murder, Condoluci's daughter, Amanda Henry, said she was relieved upon learning that Condoluci had been killed. Henry claimed she was constantly abused and raped by her father. However, his son, Joseph Condoluci, was deeply upset about the killing. After Fairbanks was sentenced, Amanda Henry said his sentence was too long and that the murder wouldn't have happened had Condoluci been punished more severely for his crimes.

== See also ==
- List of anti-sex offender attacks in the United States
- Stephen Marshall
