= Don Lattin =

American author and journalist (born 1953)

- Born: November 15, 1953 (age 72); Suffern, New York
- Education: Bachelor's degree Sociology
- Alma mater: UC Berkeley
- Occupation: Journalist

Don Lattin (born November 15, 1953) is an American journalist and author of seven books, including The Harvard Psychedelic Club (2010) and Changing Our Minds: Psychedelic Sacraments and the New Psychotherapy (2017). He has published articles in U.S. magazines and newspapers, including the San Francisco Chronicle where he worked for two decades as a staff writer covering religion, spirituality and psychology.

Lattin taught as an adjunct faculty member at the Graduate School of Journalism at the University of California at Berkeley, where he holds a degree in sociology.

== Notable works ==
- In Shopping For Faith, Lattin and co-author Richard Cimino expose how the United States shopping mall and consumer-obsessed culture influence religious choices throughout the country. The authors attempt to predict religion's role in the new millennium.
- Lattin's Following Our Bliss interprets the American spiritual and religious landscape since the 1960s. Following Our Bliss argues that the 1960s has had a profound transformative impact in every area of spirituality. This is the first comprehensive look at the spiritual legacy of the 1960s and 1970s as seen through the lives of those raised amid some of the era's wildest experimentation.
- In Jesus Freaks, Lattin tells of a January 2005 murder/suicide that sheds light on the Children of God/Family International, one of the most controversial religious movements to emerge from the 1960s and 1970s. It is the story of Ricky Rodriguez, a child born into the inner sanctum of the Children of God, a cult that sent thousands on a long, strange trip into the messianic fantasy of leader David Berg and spawned a second generation that still struggles with that legacy.
- The Harvard Psychedelic Club: How Timothy Leary, Ram Dass, Huston Smith, and Andrew Weil Killed the Fifties and Ushered in a New Age for America traces the efforts of four notable players who brought LSD to the attention of the world: Leary, Richard Alpert (later Ram Dass), Smith, and Weil. They were involved in experimenting with, and whistleblowing about, psychedelic drugs in the early 1960s. Leary and Alpert were Harvard professors who researched psychedelics for their potential benefits to alcoholics and criminals. At the suggestion of Aldous Huxley, religious scholar Huston Smith was brought in to advise about the possible link between psychedelic drugs and mystical experiences. Andrew Weil was a student at the time and a journalist for the Harvard newspaper; he eventually exposed the unorthodox drug use to University authorities, which resulted in Leary and Alpert leaving Harvard.

== Bibliography ==
=== Books ===
- Shopping for Faith: American Religion in the New Millennium. Jossey-Bass. 1998. ISBN 978-0787941703. Co-authored with Richard Cimino.
- Following Our Bliss: How the Spiritual Ideals of the Sixties Shape Our Lives Today. San Francisco: HarperSanFrancisco. 2003. ISBN 978-0060730635.
- Jesus Freaks: A True Story of Murder and Madness on the Evangelical Edge. HarperOne. 2007. ISBN 978-0061118043.
- The Harvard Psychedelic Club. HarperOne. 2010. ISBN 978-0061655937.
- Distilled Spirits: Getting High, then Sober, with a Famous Writer, a Forgotten Philosopher and a Hopeless Drunk. University of California Press. 2012. ISBN 978-0520272323.
- Changing Our Minds: Psychedelic Sacraments and the New Psychotherapy. Synergetic Press. 2017. ISBN 978-0907791669.
- God on Psychedelics: Tripping Across the Rubble of Old-Time Religion. Apocryphile Press. 2023. ISBN 978-1958061282.

=== Articles ===
- Lattin, Don (2001). "Making the Leap From Cult to Religion". Beliefnet. Archived from the original on March 31, 2001. Article first appeared in San Francisco Chronicle.
- Lattin, Don (Jan–Feb 2013). "The Second Coming of Psychedelics". Spirituality & Health. Vol. 15, no. 6. pp. 54–59.
