= Noah Hutchings =

American radio personality (1922–2015)

Noah Webster Hutchings (December 11, 1922 – June 17, 2015) was an American radio personality and the president of Southwest Radio Church Ministries, a Christian broadcasting company based in Oklahoma City. For six decades, he was the host of their nationally syndicated radio show Your Watchman On The Wall, which is still broadcast daily on stations across the USA.

Your Watchman on The Wall's main focus is Bible prophecy and exposition of end times theories as well as conservative Christian apologetics. Hutchings also contributed to the ministry's two monthly publications, Bible in the News magazine and Prophetic Observer newsletter.

== Military service ==
Noah Webster Hutchings was born on December 11, 1922, in Messer, Oklahoma, one of six children. He graduated from Hugo High School in Hugo, Oklahoma, in 1939. In November 1942, Hutchings was drafted into the United States Army because of the rising threat from Imperial Japan and Nazi Germany. After thirteen weeks of training, including physical and 155mm Howitzer, he went overseas. Hutchings had experience in the South Pacific while working as a radar technician. Hutchings completed his service during World War II and returned to Oklahoma.

== Failed predictions ==
Hutchings engaged in numerous predictions.

In 1974, Hutchings and Southwest Radio Church's David Webber co-authored the book Prophecy in Stone (Harvest Press) in which they suggested that the Rapture would take place in 1988.

In 1978, Southwest Radio Church published a pamphlet entitled God's Timetable for the 1980s in which were listed prophecies for each year of the 1980s, culminating with Christ's return and the establishment of his millennial kingdom on earth in 1989.

In a 1979 book, Is This the Last Century? (Thomas Nelson), Webber and Hutchings again suggested that the Tribulation would begin in 1981 and that Christ would return in 1988, as well as that the seven years from 1981 to 1988 would be the Tribulation period. Webber and Hutchings qualified these dates, stating that they were by no means "[presenting] a dogmatic calendar for the Lord's return".

Hutchings wrote an article entitled "The Vatican Connection" for the magazine Gospel Truth in April 1984. In this article he explained why he thought Pope John Paul II might be the Antichrist spoken of in the Bible: "In Pope John Paul we see a man who is rising in international stature, a man who will be increasing called upon to bring peace to a troubled world. His recovery from a deadly wound directed world attention and admiration to his personage, and he, like those before him, would seemingly like to establish authority over the Holy Hill of Zion."

== Y2K fears ==
In 1998 Hutchings stirred up fears among his listeners and readers with dire predictions surrounding the Y2K computer problem. His two books on the subject were Y2K=666? (with Larry Sparkman) and Does Y2K Equal 666?, both published by Hearthstone Publishing in Oklahoma City. "We are living in the most perilous times since the flood in Noah's Day. Informed sources worldwide are now becoming alarmed. Some are predicting world famine, economic disasters, world rioting, and chaos with millions dying."

Hutchings' book was noted by the San Francisco Chronicle in a story published on October 3, 1998, "2000 Computer Bug Has Apocalyptic Overtones." Chronicle religion writer Don Lattin wrote, "The alarmist response to Y2K in evangelical circles reminds many fundamentalist Christians of Bible prophecies about the Great Tribulation, a future period of violent social chaos, and the rise of the Antichrist—two events that many fundamentalist Christians believe must precede the second coming of Jesus Christ...Radio evangelist Noah Hutchings has been preaching that message over the airwaves for 48 years. His Southwest Radio Church out of Oklahoma City is heard on 100 radio stations across the country, including KCBC in Northern California."

"That number, 666", Lattin noted, "is a powerful Satanic (devil) symbol of the 'mark of the beast,' the Antichrist described in the apocalyptic visions in the Book of Revelation. In recent years, some fundamentalist Christians have identified the Antichrist with the mega computer at the World Bank, seeing an evil plot in the rise of global electronic banking, bar codes on nearly every product and computerized mailing lists for nearly every address."

Lattin then quotes from Hutchings: "Whether you like it or not, you have a mark and a number in the government's computer data bank."

Another article, in The Wall Street Journal, quoted Hutchings' speculation that "computers, with their ability to know 'all about us . . . whether we've been good or bad,' might be a tool of the Antichrist to bring down civilization."

Hutchings had co-authored an earlier book with David Webber entitled Computers and the Beast of Revelation (Huntington House, 1986).

== Other topics and beliefs ==
Hutchings also frequently commented on his belief that giants have walked the earth, the sunken city of Atlantis is real, UFOs are to be taken seriously, the Biblical Noachian Flood was global, Egyptian pyramids survived the Biblical flood essentially intact, the universe is 6000 years old, dinosaurs walked the earth with humans, and evolution is false.

Rick Miesel accused Hutchings of promoting the doctrine of the "Gospel in the Stars", the idea that the astrological signs really refer to key teachings from the Bible.

Hutchings was involved with Ken Klein in a production claiming that the Temple Mount was never the site of the Jewish Temple.

== Academic credentials challenged ==
Hutchings was criticized by a fellow evangelical Christian, William Alnor, as claiming doctorate and graduate degrees which he did not legitimately possess. However, Larry Spargimino, a close associate of Hutchings, holds legitimate M.Div. and Ph.D. degrees, from Southwestern Baptist Theological Seminary. In an August 2004 article for The Christian Sentinel, Alnor wrote, "The 'Dr.' title is bestowed on him repeatedly throughout the ministry's website, and even graces the covers of some of his published books under the by-line 'Dr. Noah Hutchings.'" Alnor reports that he contacted Hutchings, who conceded that his only earned degree was a bachelor's in accounting. Hutchings had no seminary training and no formal education in theology or biblical studies.

Hutchings was simply referred to as "Rev." on the Southwest Radio Church Ministries website. His biography there mentions that he had been the recipient of two honorary doctorates, one from St. Charles University—a diploma mill in California—and one from American Bible College and Seminary in Oklahoma City (now defunct). Neither of those institutions has been regionally accredited, although American Bible College and Seminary was nationally accredited through TRACS.

== Death ==
Hutchings died at the age of 92 on June 17, 2015. He was interred at the Rose Hill Burial Park in Oklahoma City, Oklahoma. He was survived by his wife, 1 sister, 7 children and 13 grandchildren.
