= Hercules (serial killer) =

Unidentified Bangladeshi serial killer

"Hercules" killings
- Location: Dhaka and Jhalokathi, Bangladesh
- Date: c. 17 January – 1 February 2019
- Target: Men accused of comitting rape
- Attack type: Serial killing
- Deaths: 3
- Perpetrator: "Hercules" (unidentified)
- Motive: Vigilantism

In January and February of 2019, a series of three killings of men accused in rape cases occurred in Bangladesh. The bodies were discovered in the districts of Dhaka and Jhalakathi, each with a note referring to the alleged crimes. One of the notes was signed with the name "Hercules". The identity of the person or people responsible was not publicly established.

The killings drew notoriety in Bangladesh and abroad. Some social-media users described the deaths as an appropriate punishment for the rape allegations. Human rights groups and officials expressed concern about the killings and the absence of due process. Although it is presumed to be the case, police did not confirm that the same person or group was responsible for all three deaths.

== Background ==
Public frustration over sexual violence and the handling of rape cases was high at the time. The three men had been named in two separate cases. The first concerned a garment worker in Ashulia. The second concerned a student from a religious school in Bhandaria, Pirojpur District.

Reports of unlawful killings and the use of extrajudicial force in Bangladesh existed before these events. Amnesty International documented allegations of extrajudicial executions in 2018. The United States Department of State’s 2019 human rights report also noted reports of arbitrary or unlawful killings.

=== Ashulia case ===
An 18-year-old garment worker was found dead at her home in Ashulia on 7 January 2019, hours after she filed a rape complaint against several men who worked at the same factory. Her father later filed a murder case. Ripon, a line chief at the factory, was named as a prime suspect.

=== Bhandaria case ===
A madrasa student was allegedly gang-raped on or around 12–14 January 2019 while travelling in Bhandaria, Pirojpur District. Her family filed a case on 17 January naming two men; Sajal and Rakib. Both men were the ones later found dead in Jhalakathi District.

A medical examination of the student, submitted to court on 18 January, recorded no evidence of recent forced sexual contact. The student’s father disputed the finding, stating that the examination took place several days after the alleged incident. One of the examining doctors stated that the report reflected what the examination found.

== Killings ==
=== First killing ===
Police recovered the body of Ripon, aged 39, on 17 January 2019 from an open field in Amin Model Town, Savar, near Dhaka. A note attached to the body stated that he was the prime accused in a rape case. The body showed a bullet wound to the head.

Ripon’s family said that plain-clothes men who identified themselves as members of the Detective Branch of police had taken him from his home several days earlier. Police denied any involvement and stated that Ripon had gone into hiding after the case was filed.

=== Second killing ===
The body of Sajal, aged 28, was found on 26 January 2019 in a paddy field in the Kathalia area of Jhalakathi District. A note attached to the body identified him as the rapist of the madrasa student and described the death as his punishment. The body showed a wound consistent with a gunshot.

Sajal’s wife said he had left home after the rape allegations and telephoned her on the night of 22 January while travelling toward Chittagong. That was the last contact. Family members and witnesses later alleged that plain-clothes individuals claiming to be law-enforcement officers had taken him from a bus near Sitakunda.

=== Third killing ===
On 1 February 2019, police recovered the body of Rakib, aged about 20-28, near a brickfield in Rajapur, Jhalakathi District. A note attached to the body identified him as the rapist of the madrasa student from Bhandaria, stated that this was the fate of a rapist, warned other rapists, and was signed “Hercules” (Bengali: হারকিউলিস). The body showed multiple wounds, including one to the head.

Rakib’s father said his son had left the village after the case was filed and was living near Nabinagar, Savar. On 24 or 25 January, men travelling in microbuses approached him and a friend at a tea stall, selected Rakib, and took him away. His friend was released. The family attempted to report him missing but said police did not accept the complaint.

=== Notes and similarities ===
Each of the three bodies carried a note referring to the rape allegations against the deceased. The notes described the men as accused or as rapists and presented the deaths as punishment, one note said "This is the punishment for rape. Rapists beware". The third note was the first to carry the name “Hercules”.

The three cases shared several features: the victims had been named in recent rape complaints, their bodies were found in different locations, and notes were left with them. Police stated that they had not established whether the same person or group was responsible for all three deaths. The name “Hercules” was used in media reports to refer to the unknown perpetrator or perpetrators.

== Investigation and government response ==
Local police investigated the deaths. Additional Inspector General of Police Shohel Rana told reporters that local units were handling the cases and that headquarters saw no immediate need for a central investigation. He said authorities had not confirmed that the same person or group was behind all three killings.

On 8 February 2019, Home Minister Asaduzzaman Khan stated that the killings were unacceptable. He said people accused of crimes should be handed over to the authorities rather than killed, and that the government intended to identify those responsible.

The National Human Rights Commission of Bangladesh criticised the killings. Its chairman, Kazi Reazul Hoque, said that no one had the authority to take the law into their own hands and that suspects should be dealt with through the legal system.

== Public reaction ==
Some social-media users praised the deaths and described them as a form of justice. This response was linked to public anger over sexual violence and delays in the courts.

Human rights organisations raised objections. Ain o Salish Kendra called for proper investigations and warned that killings outside the legal system could damage confidence in the police and courts. The organisation said the legal process needed strengthening so that accused persons could be tried.

Human rights activist Sultana Kamal also criticised the killings. She said deaths outside the courts could undermine public confidence in the judiciary and called on the authorities to investigate.

Many local opinion writers argued that punishment should remain with the judicial system. One article stated that killing people accused of rape was not a solution and that criminal cases should be handled by the courts. Another article said vigilante killings threatened the rule of law.

== Later reporting ==
In March 2019, Prothom Alo published an investigation into the alleged abductions of the two men named in the Bhandaria case. Witnesses said both men had been taken by people who identified themselves as law-enforcement officials. No agency confirmed that it had detained either man.

According to the investigation, Sajal was travelling by bus from Dhaka toward Chittagong on 22 January. Near Sitakunda the bus was stopped by people in a white car who said they were law-enforcement officers. They matched passengers against a photograph on a mobile phone and took one passenger away. The bus driver photographed the car’s registration plate. The vehicle was registered to a government department whose registered address was the headquarters of a law-enforcement agency.

The investigation also reported that Rakib was taken from a tea stall in Nabinagar, Savar, by men travelling in two microbuses. A friend who was present said the men selected Kabith and released the friend. Phone records supplied by the family of one of the men showed a series of blank text messages sent shortly before the alleged abductions. An official familiar with investigative methods said such messages could be used to locate a phone and that the capability was available to a government-assigned agency used by security and law-enforcement bodies.

In February 2025, it was reported that many users on social media "demanded the return of Hercules" after multiple high profile sexual assault cases happening in the country during the year.

== See also ==
- Robert Maudsley
- Pedro Rodrigues Filho
- 1945 Katsuyama killing incident
- Killings of William Elliott and Joseph Gray
- Killing of Jeffrey Doucet
- 2019 Hyderabad gang rape and murder § Killing of the suspects
