= Karen Zerby =

Leader of "The Family International"

- Born: Karen Elva Zerby; July 31, 1946 (age 80); Camden, New Jersey, U.S.
- Other names: Maria, “Mama” Maria, Maria David, Maria Fontaine, “Queen” Maria
- Occupation: Former co-director of The Children of God/The Family International
- Spouses: David Berg (m. 1970; died 1994) Steven Douglas Kelly (m. 1994)
- Children: 2, including Ricky Rodriguez

Karen Elva Zerby (born July 31, 1946) is the former leader of The Family International, a cult founded by her former husband David Berg as the “Children of God”, proven in court to have promoted and enacted sexual abuse of adults and children, including prostitution as a means of proselytizing. She is also referred to by her followers as Maria, “Mama” Maria, Maria David, Maria Fontaine, and “Queen” Maria.

== Biography ==
Zerby was raised in evangelical Pentecostalism. Her father was a Nazarene minister, and she is credited with bringing the "fundamental Pentecostal principle of being 'Spirit-led'" into the movement she eventually came to lead.

She joined the group, then called Teens for Christ, in 1969. Trained as a stenographer, she became the personal secretary to David Berg, the group's founder, and was instrumental in transcribing his classes. He later separated from his first wife, Jane, and Zerby became his wife. Berg openly explained this to his followers via a missive called "The Old Church and the New Church".

By the mid 1980s, Zerby began to issue religious edicts of her own: following criminal court-proven accounts of physical and sexual abuse of adults and children, mostly unpaid prostitution in order to gain new members, she forbade sexual activity in 1984 for new members until they had been in the group for six months. However, the cult publications by her husband, David Brandt Berg, and herself as his secretary, were only made available to new members after these six months or later, in which the sexual methods that had been used to recruit them and also sexual abuse of children were pervertedly described and promoted as being godly and proof of being radically devoted to God and Jesus. In 1986, in writing, she forbade sexual contact between adults and minors; later, it became an offense that could lead to excommunication. However, her husband and other members of their household were incestuously and sexually abusing children, as described by themselves in a publication they distributed to members of their cult. This material was reviewed by the UK court, which passed judgment of conviction. This child abuse and sexual child abuse was also described by her son Ricky Rodriguez, who later took his own life and killed his nanny for her sexual abuse of him, and because photos of her sexually abusing him were in their publication that specifically promoted it, falsely using Bible verses in a way that was the opposite of what they meant. Throughout the 1980s, she dictated and enforced elements of discipline, ending, for instance, a training program for children she deemed too harsh which included public beatings during “exorcisms” in front of peers. However, she and David Berg, whom she lived with at the time, put descriptions of these cruel actions into writing, as publications for their followers, as an example for them to follow. With David Berg's health declining in the late 1980s, Zerby essentially took over the leadership position in 1988. After Berg's death in 1994, she married Steven Kelly, another group leader, and assumed the spiritual leadership of the group. She retired in 2025.

== Child abuse controversies ==
In 1975, while living in Tenerife, Spain, Zerby had a son, Ricky Rodriguez, who was to "guide them all when the End Times came". Rodriguez's childhood (Berg was his stepfather) was recorded in a book called The Story of Davidito, which was meant to be an example to other members on how to raise their children. The book encourages child sexual abuse. According to the book, Zerby participated in the sexual abuse of her son, alongside David Berg, from the time he was 18 months old, and allowed her seven-year-old daughter Christina to be raised in a similar manner. During this period, the group's leadership, including Zerby, were highly secretive, living in remote locations and being barely seen by anyone. Zerby was known to the group's followers mostly from cartoons in the group's internal publications until 2005 when recent photos of her were released online.

In January 2005, Rodriguez murdered former group member Angela Smith, a former nanny; hours later, Rodriguez committed suicide. In a video recorded the night before, "he said he saw himself as a vigilante avenging children like him and his sisters who had been subject to rapes and beatings". Apparently, he had been looking for his mother and sister: "He wanted to see his mother prosecuted for child abuse, and to free Techi from the group".
