= Pedro Rodrigues Filho =

Brazilian serial killer (1954–2023)

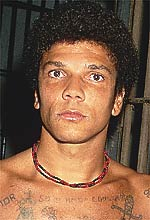
- Rodrigues in 1991
- Born: Pedro Rodrigues Filho; 29 October 1954; Santa Rita do Sapucaí, Minas Gerais, Brazil
- Died: 5 March 2023 (aged 68); Mogi das Cruzes, São Paulo, Brazil
- Cause of death: Gunshot and stab wounds
- Other names: Killer Petey; Pedrinho Matador
- Criminal charges: 71 counts of murder confirmed (1968–2007), suspected to be 100 or more; riot and deprivation of liberty (2011–2018)
- Criminal penalty: 34 years imprisonment (1973–2007); 8 years imprisonment (7 served on good behavior; 2011–2018)
- Partner: Maria Aparecida "Botinha" Olympia (1969–1971; murdered by street gang while pregnant)

YouTube information
- Channel: 2P Entretenimento
- Years active: 2018–2023
- Genres: Commentary, review (true crime, podcast)
- Subscribers: 242 thousand
- Views: 36.4 million
- Last updated: 13 March 2026

Pedro Rodrigues Filho (29 October 1954 – 5 March 2023), also known as Pedrinho Matador, Killer Lil' Pedro, Killer Killer Petey, or simply Killer Petey, was a Brazilian serial killer, spree killer, vigilante known for pursuing and killing other criminals and suspected criminals. He committed most of his crimes as a teenager, when he was between 14 and 19 years old, and was officially sentenced for 71 murders, but claimed to have killed over 100 people, including drug dealers, rapists, and murderers, and served a total of 34 years in prison before his release in 2007. In 2011, Rodrigues was imprisoned again on charges of inciting riot and deprivation of liberty for crimes committed in prison; he was sentenced to eight years in prison, but was released again in 2018 after seven years on good behavior.

Following Rodrigues' initial planned 2003 release, author Jeff Lindsay began publishing a novel series about a fictional American serial killer of killers, inspired by Rodrigues, named Dexter Morgan. The series' success, along with that of its 2006 television adaptation and 2021 revival, led to widespread retrospective media attention being brought to Rodrigues, with him becoming internationally known alternately both as the "Brazilian Dexter" and the "South American Punisher" (after the Marvel Comics character of the same name).

After his second release from prison in 2018, Rodrigues declared himself to be reformed from his self-declared vigilantism as a youth and publicly vowed to commit no further crimes, becoming a Brazilian celebrity and YouTuber, maintaining a YouTube channel called "Pedrinho EX Matador" ("Ex-Killer Petey") on which he commented on modern crimes while educating the public that criminal acts are not something of which to be proud. In 2023, Rodrigues was killed in a drive-by shooting and stabbing by unidentified assailants.

== Early life ==
Rodrigues was born on a farm in Santa Rita do Sapucaí, in southern Minas Gerais, Brazil. His skull had been bruised as a result of his father kicking his very pregnant mother's belly during a fight. He claimed he felt the urge to kill for the first time at age 13—when in a fight with an older cousin, he was punched in the face. As Pedro laid there on the ground, he looked up at his cousin and said, "I'm going to kill you"; not knowing that he was serious, his cousin laughed it off. Later on, Pedro pushed the young man into a sugar cane press, almost ripping his whole arm off, and pulled a knife on him. When their family heard the cries, they came to the cousin's aid, leading to consequences for Pedro.

== Crime spree ==
At age 14, Rodrigues shot the deputy mayor of Santa Rita do Sapucaí in front of the city hall for having fired his father, a school guard, over accusations of stealing food from the school kitchen, putting him in jail, before shooting the security guard whom he suspected as the actual thief, using his grandfather's shotgun for both. On the run, Rodrigues took refuge in Mogi das Cruzes, Greater São Paulo, where he began robbing drug dens and killing drug traffickers, making him a celebrity in the news media as the vigilante "Pedrinho Matador" (Little Pedro the Killer).

Rodrigues soon met Maria Aparecida Olympia, nicknamed Botinha, and they began living together. Rodrigues took on the duties of Botinha's deceased husband, a local drug lord. Due to his new place in a local street gang, he was soon "forced" to eliminate some rivals, killing three ex-cronies. Botinha became pregnant with his child but was murdered shortly thereafter by a rival gang leader. Still underage, Rodrigues escaped, going on a revenge-killing spree by tracking down and killing every member of the rival gang.

=== Supposed patricide ===
Rodrigues once claimed to have killed his own father inside prison at age 20 by stabbing him twenty two times and chewing a part of his heart, supposedly in retaliation for his father having killed his mother by stabbing her twenty one times: "He stabbed my mother twenty one times, so I stabbed him twenty two", said Rodrigues in an interview to journalist Marcelo Rezende on RecordTV. "People say I ate his heart. No, I simply cut it, because it was revenge, right? I cut and threw it away. I take a piece of it, chewed and threw it away", he explained. He would also have a revolver on his waist, but preferred to use the knife. When asked about how he got the revolver, he said he locked a policeman in a cell and took the gun from him.

According to criminal biographer and journalist Ullisses Campbell, this is not a true account. Despite having really killed his mother, Rodrigues's father died only years later, in prison, due to respiratory disease.

== First prison sentence and release ==
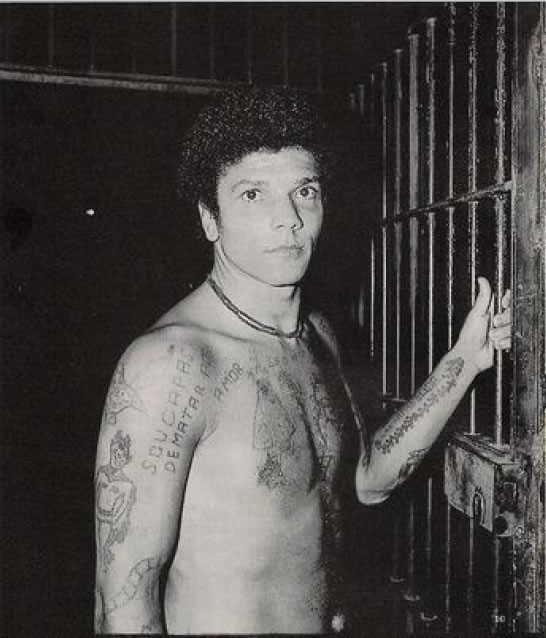
Rodrigues in prison in 1991

On 24 May 1973, at the age of 18, Rodrigues was arrested for the first time, and lived in prison most of his adult years. Police records show that he was once transported in a vehicle with another prisoner, both handcuffed. During transport, Rodrigues killed the other inmate without the police noticing. When they opened the car door and saw the other prisoner was dead, Rodrigues said he did it because the man was a rapist. Although he was sentenced to 126 years imprisonment, he was to be released in 2003 because Brazilian law at the time. After staying in prison for 34 years, Rodrigues was released on 24 April 2007, and he was reported to have moved to Fortaleza in Ceará.

== Second prison sentence and release ==
On 15 September 2011, Rodrigues was arrested at his rural home in Balneário Camboriú, where he worked as a caretaker. He was sentenced to eight years. He was released for good behaviour on 10 December 2018, after seven years.

== YouTube career ==
Following his second release from prison in 2018 and after announcing himself to be retired from his self-declared vigilantism as a youth and officially committed not to commit any more crimes, Rodrigues became a YouTuber, maintaining a YouTube channel called "Pedrinho EX Matador" (literally: "Ex-Killer Petey"), on which he commented on modern crimes, campaigned against gang violence, and attempted to teach the public not to be proud of criminal acts.

== Murder ==
At about 10 a.m. on 5 March 2023 in Mogi das Cruzes, Rodrigues was shot by three unidentified men firing from a black car, after which one of the assailants came over and finished him off with a knife to the throat, in a near decapitation, and Rodrigues was already dead when police arrived. According to a witness, he was on a sidewalk carrying a child in his arms at the moment of the assault, but the child was not harmed, and one of the suspects fled in a second, white car. Police later found and searched the first car but no suspects have been identified or arrested.

== In popular culture ==
Following his initial planned 2003 release, Rodrigues was the principal inspiration for Dexter Morgan, the antihero protagonist of the 2004 Dexter book series written by Jeff Lindsay, as well as its 2006 television series adaptation of the same name by James Manos Jr., in which he is portrayed by Michael C. Hall, who won a Golden Globe Award for Best Actor in a Television Series or Drama and Television Critics Association Award for Individual Achievement in Drama and was nominated five times for a Primetime Emmy Award for Outstanding Lead Actor in a Drama Series for his portrayal of the character, before reprising his role as Dexter in the 2021–22 revival series Dexter: New Blood by Clyde Phillips. The success of the novel series and Showtime television franchise additionally led to Rodrigues acquiring the new international media nickname of "The Brazilian Dexter".

Because of the list of crimes and his behavior in jail, Rodrigues joined the list of killers quoted by writer Ilana Casoy in the book Serial Killers – Made in Brazil. The publication tells stories of murderers like Marcelo Costa de Andrade and Francisco da Costa Rocha.

== See also ==
- List of serial killers in Brazil
- List of serial killers by number of victims
- Killer Killer, a 2016 manga series about serial killers of killers, inspired by Rodrigues.
- Snowtown murders, an Australian serial killing incident that is based on similar grounds.
- Robert Maudsley - English serial killer who targeted rapists and child molesters
- Manuel Pardo, an American serial killer who is also referenced as the inspiration for Dexter Morgan.
- Hercules (serial killer), unidentified serial killer who targeted men accused of rape in Bangladesh.
- Florisvaldo de Oliveira
- Sombra Negra
- Davao Death Squad
- Edgar Matobato
