= David Berg =

American cult leader (1919–1994)

- Born: David Brandt Berg; February 18, 1919; Oakland, California, United States
- Died: October 1, 1994 (aged 75); Costa de Caparica, Portugal
- Other names: Moses David; King David; Mo; Father David; Dad; Grandpa
- Occupation: Founder of Children of God
- Spouses: Jane Miller (m. 1944; div. 1970) Karen Zerby (m. 1970)
- Children: 4
- Website: www.davidberg.org

David Brandt Berg (Note: Known to his followers variously as King David, Mo, Moses David, Father David, Dad, or Grandpa.) (February 18, 1919 – October 1, 1994) was an American cult leader who founded the "Children of God", which was later known as The Family International. Berg's group, established in 1968 among the counterculture youth in Southern California, gained notoriety for incorporating sexuality into its spiritual message and recruitment methods. Berg and his organization were accused of a broad range of sexual misconduct, including child sexual abuse.

== Life ==
=== Family heritage ===
Berg's maternal grandfather was John Lincoln Brandt (1860–1946), a Disciples of Christ minister, author, and lecturer of Muskogee, Oklahoma. Brandt had a dramatic conversion in his mid-twenties and immediately entered full-time Christian service. For years he was a Methodist circuit rider. He later became a leader of the Alexander Campbell movement of the Disciples of Christ, a restoration movement that developed into the current Protestant denomination Christian Church (Disciples of Christ). The Brandt family were descended from ethnic German Jews who had converted to Anabaptism in the 18th century, with involvement with the Mennonites and the Dunkard Brethren Church.

=== Early years (1919–1969) ===
Berg was born on February 18, 1919, in Oakland, California. During his early years, he usually lived in or around Florida.

He was the youngest of three children born to Hjalmar Emmanuel Berg and Virginia Lee Brandt, both Christian evangelists. His father, a Swedish immigrant, was a minstrel performer and singer who had been converted to the Disciples of Christ by his father-in-law.

Virginia and Hjalmar were expelled from the Disciples of Christ after publicly testifying of her divine healing, which was contrary to church doctrine. They subsequently joined a new denomination, the Christian and Missionary Alliance, shortly before David's birth. In later years, their missionary zeal and disdain for denominational politicking often set them at variance with the conservative faction of that church's hierarchy, causing them to work largely as independent pastors and evangelists.

Berg spent his early years traveling with his parents, who pursued their evangelical mission. In 1924, they settled in Miami, Florida, after Virginia successfully led a series of large revivals at the Miami Gospel Tabernacle. This became Berg's home for the next 14 years, while his mother and father were pastors at a number of Miami churches. The Berg family depended entirely on the generosity of their parishioners for their support, and often had difficulty making ends meet. This instilled in Berg a lifelong habit of frugality, which he encouraged his followers to adopt.

Berg graduated from Monterey High School in 1935 and later attended Elliott School of Business Administration. Like his father, Berg became a minister in the Christian and Missionary Alliance in the late 1940s, and was placed at Valley Farms, Arizona. Berg was eventually expelled from the organization for differences in teachings and for alleged sexual misconduct with a church employee. In Berg's writings he claimed the expulsion was due to his support for greater racial diversity among his congregation.

Fred Jordan, Berg's friend and boss, allowed Berg and his personal family to open and run a branch of his Soul Clinic in Miami, Florida, as a missionary training school. After running into trouble with local authorities over his aggressive disapproval of evolution being taught as fact in public schools, Berg moved his family to Fred Jordan's Texas Soul Clinic, in Western Texas.

=== The Children of God/The Family (1968–1994) ===
Berg and his family founded the organization Teens for Christ, operating out of the Light Club coffeehouse in Huntington Beach, California, in 1968. While in California, after encountering strong resistance from local churches due to his followers picketing them, he took the whole group of 40–100 people on the road. It was while they were camped in Lewis and Clark Park that a news reporter first called them "The Children of God".

Around the end of 1969, about 200 members of the COG group established a 425-acre "colony" several miles from Thurber, Texas - a ghost town. This acreage was owned by the American Soul Clinic.

In the mid-1970s, Berg began preparing his followers for a "revelation" he had about Flirty Fishing, or winning important, influential men through prostitution.

By 1971, the COG claimed that it had 4,000 members, mostly consisting of teenagers and people in their early 20s. In November of 1971, COG's colony was evicted after a serious disagreement with American Soul Clinic's head Fred Jordan and other associates.

In 1978, in an attempt to deflect public concern over some of his more controversial policies, Berg changed the name to the "Family of Love". In 1991, this was changed to "The Family", and in 2004 it was changed again to "The Family International".

Berg lived in seclusion, communicating with his followers and the public via nearly 3,000 "Mo Letters" ("Mo" from his pseudonym "Moses David") that he wrote on a wide variety of subjects. These typically covered spiritual or practical subjects and were used as a way of disseminating and introducing policy and religious doctrine to his followers. Berg's letters admonished the reader to "love the sinner but hate the sin". His writings were often extreme and uncompromising in their denunciation of what he believed to be evil, such as mainstream churches, pedophilia laws, capitalism, and Jews.

=== Death and legacy ===
Berg, who had been in hiding since 1971, died in November 1994 in Portugal. He was buried in Costa de Caparica, and his remains were cremated.

After his death in 1994, his wife led The Family, and there were 6,000 adults and 3,000 children as members of The Family worldwide, in 50 countries. There were investigations of The Family for child abuse and prostitution in Argentina, France, Spain, Australia, Venezuela, and Peru.

== Sexual abuse, antisemitism, and apocalyptic predictions ==
Berg has been accused of leading a group which promoted assaults on children and sexual abuse of women and children for decades. Former members have told their stories in widely disseminated media reports, though official inquiries at the time found no evidence of child abuse.

In a child custody case in the United Kingdom, Berg's granddaughter, Merry Berg, testified that Berg sexually molested her when she was a young teenager.

The allegations of Berg's institutionalization of pedophilia and sexual abuse were also described in Not Without My Sister, an autobiographical recount of the sexual abuse of three sisters who eventually escaped The Family.

Berg's Jewish ancestry notwithstanding — in 1745, one of his mother's forebears, Jewish by birth but a Christian convert, moved to the American colonies and lived as a Mennonite—David Berg was outspokenly antisemitic, believing that the Jews were responsible for the death of Jesus, as well as all persecution of Christians in the world. In support of his views of an international Jewish conspiracy, he cited the forged Protocols of the Elders of Zion, but disclaimed the label "antisemitic."

Berg incorrectly predicted that the state of California would be subject to a massive earthquake in 1969.

== Personal life ==
Berg married his first wife, Jane Miller (known as "Mother Eve" in the Children of God), on July 22, 1944, in Glendale, California. They had four children.

Berg married his second wife, Karen Zerby, in 1970. Berg informally adopted Ricky Rodriguez, Zerby's son. In the 1970s and 1980s, sexually suggestive photographic depictions of Rodriguez with adult caretakers were disseminated throughout the group by Berg and Zerby in a childrearing handbook known as The Story of Davidito. In January 2005, Ricky Rodriguez murdered one of the female caretakers shown in the handbook before taking his own life several hours later.

== Media featuring Berg ==
- Children of God, documentary, directed by John Smithson, 1994.
- The Love Prophet and the Children of God, documentary on Berg and his organization, 1998
- Cult Killer, documentary on Ricky Rodriguez and child abuse within The Family International.
- Sex Cult Nun: Breaking Away from the Children of God, a Wild, Radical Religious Cult, an autobiography written by Faith Jones
- Apocalypse Child: A Life in End Times, memoir by Flor Christine Edwards.
- Leaving Isn't The Hardest Thing, a collection of essays by Lauren Hough.
- Uncultured, an autobiography written by Daniella Mestyanek Young.
