= Robert Maudsley =

English serial killer (born 1953)

- Born: Robert John Maudsley; 26 June 1953 (age 73); Speke, Liverpool, England
- Other names: Hannibal the Cannibal; The Brain Eater; Blue; Spoons; Britain's Own Hannibal; Wolfie; Britain's Most Dangerous Prisoner
- Motive: Vigilantism; hatred for pedophilia, domestic abuse, and sex crimes
- Convictions: Murder (3 counts); Manslaughter
- Penalty: Life imprisonment (whole life tariff)

Details
- Victims: 4
- Span of crimes: 1974–1978
- Country: England
- Locations: London, Broadmoor, Wakefield Prison, HM Prison Whitemoor
- Date apprehended: March 14, 1974

Robert John Maudsley (born 26 June 1953) is an English serial killer. Maudsley first killed a man who showed him pictures of children he had sexually abused. After surrendering himself to police and saying he needed psychiatric care, Maudsley was sent to Broadmoor Hospital, where he killed a convicted child molester. He later killed two men on the same day: one imprisoned for murdering and sexually assaulting his wife, and another imprisoned for attempting to strangle a four-year-old girl. Maudsley's killings have been described as vigilantism.

Initial reports falsely stated he ate part of the brain of one of the men he killed in prison, which earned him the nickname "Hannibal the Cannibal" from parts of the British press and "The Brain Eater" among other prisoners. National newspapers were advised that the allegations were untrue, according to the post-mortem report. Maudsley is the longest-serving British prisoner in solitary confinement.

== Early life ==
Robert Maudsley was the fourth of 12 children, born in Speke, Liverpool. He spent his early years in a Catholic orphanage in Crosby, with his three older siblings. At the age of eight, Maudsley and his three older siblings were retrieved by their parents. Robert was subjected to routine physical abuse from his father until he was removed from their care by social services. Maudsley later stated that he was raped as a child by his father, and such early abuse left deep psychological scars.

He sought psychiatric help after several suicide attempts. He told doctors that he claimed to hear voices telling him to kill his parents. He is quoted as saying, "If I had killed my parents in 1970, none of these people would have died."

== Murders ==
In 1974, Maudsley garrotted John Farrell in Wood Green, London. Farrell had picked up Maudsley for sex and shown him pictures of children he had sexually abused. Maudsley surrendered himself to police, saying he needed psychiatric care. Maudsley was found unfit to stand trial and was sent to Broadmoor Hospital.

In 1977, he and another patient, David Cheeseman, who was serving a sentence for attempted murder, locked themselves in a cell with a third patient, David Francis, a convicted child molester. Maudsley had previously held another prisoner, Philip Monk, hostage with Francis in September 1976. The attack was claimed to be in revenge for a "homosexual attack" on one of the friends of the two men. Cheeseman told police he had killed Francis to leave Broadmoor and be placed in a prison, threatening to kill again if he was not moved. The two men tortured Francis to death over a period of nine hours, with the cause of death being strangulation with a garrote. Francis' body had bruises from where he was beaten during the attack. Maudsley and Cheeseman had arranged the killing three days prior by moving furniture to make it easier to set up a barricade. After this incident, Maudsley was convicted of manslaughter and sent to Wakefield Prison. He disliked the transfer and made it clear he wanted to return to Broadmoor. Maudsley was later sentenced to life imprisonment, with a recommendation that he never be released.

In 1978, Maudsley killed two fellow prisoners at Wakefield Prison in one day. He had originally set out to kill seven. His first victim was Salney Darwood, who was serving a life sentence for the manslaughter of his wife. At the time, Darwood had been giving Maudsley French lessons. Maudsley invited Darwood to his cell, where he garroted and stabbed him before hiding his body under his bed. He then attempted to lure other prisoners into his cell, but they all refused.

Maudsley then prowled the wing hunting for a second victim, cornering prisoner William Roberts, who was serving a 7-year sentence for trying to strangle a four-year-old girl to rape her, and stabbing him to death as he was lying in his bed. Maudsley had never met Roberts before killing him. He hacked at Roberts' skull with a makeshift dagger and then struck his head against the wall multiple times. Maudsley calmly walked into the wing office, placed the dagger on the table, and told the officer that the next roll call would be two short.

Maudsley states his victims were rapists, paedophiles, or sex offenders, and that those are the people to whom he is a threat.

== Victims ==
- John Farrell, age 30, on 14 March 1974. Farrell had shown a then 20-year-old Maudsley photographs of children he had molested. This was the original murder for which Maudsley was sentenced.
- David Francis, age 26, on 26 February 1977. Francis was a convicted child molester imprisoned at Broadmoor.
- Salney Darwood, age 46, on 29 July 1978. Darwood had been serving a life sentence for murdering his wife, and was also convicted of sexual offences.
- William Roberts, age 56, on 29 July 1978. Roberts was serving a seven-year sentence for trying to strangle a four-year-old girl and attempting to rape her.

== Solitary confinement ==
In 1983, Maudsley was deemed too dangerous for a normal cell. Prison authorities built a two-cell unit in the basement of Wakefield Prison. When outside his cell, he was supervised by at least four prison officers due to his history of violence.

In March 2000, Maudsley unsuccessfully attempted for the terms of his solitary confinement to be relaxed, or to be allowed to take his own life via a cyanide capsule. He asked for a pet budgerigar, which was denied.

In 2003, Maudsley was moved to Wakefield Prison's Close Supervision Centre, which was built to house Britain's most dangerous inmates. He was let out of his cell one hour every day to exercise.

In March 2025, Maudsley began a hunger strike after his luxury items, such as a video game console, books, and a music system, were confiscated by prison guards. The following month, more than 50 years into his life sentence, after more than 40 years in solitary confinement, it was reported that he had been moved from Wakefield Prison to a Category A facility in HMP Whitemoor.

== See also ==
- List of serial killers in the United Kingdom
- List of serial killers by number of victims
- Pedro Rodrigues Filho - another vigilante serial killer of rapists and murderers
- Hercules (serial killer)
