= Killing of Daniel Mark Driver =

1993 vigilante killing in Jamestown, California

On April 2, 1993, Daniel Mark Driver was fatally shot in a courtroom in Jamestown, California, United States, by Elena Starr Nesler, after Driver had been accused of molesting her son. The case was reported on throughout the United States, and the Associated Press wrote that the incident "sparked a national debate about vigilantism".

== Killing of Daniel Mark Driver ==
Nesler made headlines on April 2, 1993, when she killed Daniel Mark Driver - who had been accused of sexually abusing five boys, including Nesler's then-six-year-old son, William - in the courtroom of the Jamestown Justice Court. She fired five shots into Driver's head, killing him instantly. Driver had previous convictions for child molestation.

According to Jon Thurber of the Los Angeles Times, the finding that Nesler was under the influence of methamphetamine when she killed Driver caused the "sympathetic portrait" of herself portrayed by her defense team to "erode". She served 3 1/2 years in jail as her case wound its way through trial and appeal before she pleaded guilty to voluntary manslaughter. Judge William Polley sentenced her to 10 years in prison, describing the murder of Driver as "nothing more than an execution." Nesler was released from prison in 1997.

== Later life of Nesler ==
In 2002, Nesler was convicted of selling and possessing methamphetamine. She was released from a woman's facility near Chowchilla, California in 2006. She died in December 2008 of breast cancer at UC Davis Medical Center.

== Legacy ==
The 1999 television film Judgment Day: The Ellie Nesler Story was based upon the incident, starring Christine Lahti as Nesler.

== See also ==
- Killing of Jeffrey Doucet
- List of anti-sex offender attacks in the United States
- Marianne Bachmeier
