= Killing of Jeffrey Doucet =

1984 vigilante killing of sex offender in Baton Rouge, Louisiana

- Doucet (front), right before being fatally shot by Plauché (left)
- Date: March 16, 1984; 42 years ago
- Location: Baton Rouge Metropolitan Airport, Louisiana
- Type: Shooting, anti-pedophile vigilantism
- Motive: Revenge for Doucet's kidnapping and raping of Plauche's son
- Target: Jeffrey Doucet
- Perpetrator: Leon Gary Plauche
- Filmed by: WBRZ-TV reporters
- Deaths: 1
- Verdict: Pled guilty to manslaughter
- Sentence: Five years of probation
- Weapon: .38-caliber snub-nosed revolver

On March 16, 1984, Leon Gary Plauché (/ploʊˈʃeɪ/ ploh-SHAY; November 10, 1945 – October 20, 2014) shot and killed Jeffrey Paul Doucet (/ˈduːsɛt/ DOO-set; February 3, 1959 – March 17, 1984), who had kidnapped and molested Plauché's son, Joseph Boyce "Jody" Plauché (born April 27, 1972). Plauché shot Doucet as he was being escorted through Baton Rouge Metropolitan Airport by law enforcement to face trial, an event that was captured on camera by a local news crew. Plauché was given a seven-year suspended sentence with five years' probation and 300 hours of community service, receiving no prison time. When he was questioned as to why he shot Doucet, Plauché contended that he was in the right for killing Doucet for sexually assaulting his son and that any parent in a similar position would have done the same thing, stating "If somebody did it to your kid, you'd do it too."

== Kidnapping of Plauché's son by Doucet ==
Plauché, a native of Baton Rouge, Louisiana, was separated from his wife, June, at the time of the shooting. He served as a sergeant in the United States Air Force and worked as a heavy equipment salesman. During 1983 and 1984, his eleven-year-old son Jody was taking karate lessons with 25-year-old instructor Jeffrey Doucet. Unbeknownst to Jody's parents, Doucet had been sexually abusing him for at least a year. On February 14, 1984, Doucet kidnapped Jody and took him to a motel in Anaheim, California, where he sexually assaulted him. Jody, the focus of a nationwide search, was found after Doucet allowed the boy to place a collect call to his mother from the motel. California police raided the motel and arrested Doucet on February 29 without incident.

On March 1, 1984, Jody was returned to his family in Louisiana. In an interview with a news television crew, Plauché stated that after he heard reports that Doucet had sexually assaulted his son, he felt a sense of helplessness and did not know how to deal with the situation.

== Killing of Doucet ==
On March 16, 1984, Doucet was flown back to Louisiana to face trial. He arrived at Baton Rouge Metropolitan Airport and was led in handcuffs by police officers through the airport at around 9:30 p.m., where Plauché was waiting for Doucet.

An employee of the local ABC affiliate, WBRZ-TV, had told Plauché when Doucet would be arriving at the airport. A news crew from WBRZ was waiting for Doucet and had set up their cameras to record his arrival. Opposite the news crew was a bank of payphones, where Plauché waited while talking to his best friend on a telephone with his back turned. He wore a baseball cap and sunglasses as a disguise so that no one would see and recognize him, and tracked the reflection of the camera lights on the wall as they panned toward him recording Doucet.

As Doucet was escorted through the airport, he passed the news crew who were taping the scene. He then walked past Plauché, who aimed his weapon and fired at the right side of Doucet's head at close range. Doucet fell to the floor, bleeding from a wound near his right ear. Plauché placed the telephone receiver down before a police officer restrained him and removed the gun from his hand as the other attended to Doucet. The officers who grabbed hold of Plauché recognized him. They kept him pinned against the bank of telephones, asking him, "Gary, why? Why, Gary?" The incident was captured on video. Doucet fell into a coma and was rushed to the hospital, where he died the next day.

== Aftermath ==
Gary Plauché, shortly after shooting Doucet

Plauché was initially charged with second-degree murder, but agreed to a plea bargain in which he pleaded no contest to manslaughter. He was sentenced to a seven-year suspended sentence, with five years' probation and 300 more hours of community service, which he completed in 1989.

Psychological reports helped Plauché's case after it was learned that Doucet had abused Jody months prior to the kidnapping. The psychiatrist Edward P. Uzee examined Plauché and determined that he could not tell the difference between right and wrong when he killed Doucet. Plauché's defense team argued that he was driven to a temporarily psychotic state after learning of the abuse of his son. Uzee also determined that Doucet had the ability to manipulate others and took advantage of the fact that Plauché was separated from his wife at the time, and had managed to wedge his way into the Plauché family. Judge Frank Saia ruled that sending Plauché to prison would not help anyone, and that there was virtually no risk of him committing another crime.

The video of Plauché killing Doucet has been featured on many television programs and documentaries, including the 1994 shockumentary Traces of Death II and the 2002 Michael Moore-directed documentary Bowling for Columbine. The footage has also been uploaded to YouTube, where the video has received more than 20 million views. One video featured on YouTube was taken from the television series Anatomy of Crime, which aired in 2000 on Court TV and was produced by John Langley, the creator of Cops.

At age 67, Plauché gave an interview where he stated that he did not regret killing Doucet and would do so again.

In August 2019, the book "Why, Gary, Why?": The Jody Plauché Story was released by his son Jody. The younger Plauché revealed he was initially upset at his father as he saw Doucet as a friend and mentor but eventually came to terms with him. Jody himself later became a sexual abuse awareness activist. He attended Louisiana State University where he served on the executive board of Men Against Violence; upon graduation, he worked at the Victim Services Center of Montgomery County as a sexual assault counselor. In 2024, Jody appeared in an interview for the Mirror in which he stated that he was happy with his life and regarded his father as "the greatest dad of all time".

Plauché suffered a stroke in 2011. After having another stroke in 2014 at a nursing home, he died at the age of 68.

== In popular culture ==
- The song "Punish" by Ethel Cain, a song from the perspective of a pedophile who was shot by his victim's father, references the incident by describing the father as "a natural Plauché".

== See also ==
- Killing of Daniel Mark Driver – 1993 vigilante killing in Jamestown, California
- List of anti-sex offender attacks in the United States
- Marianne Bachmeier – German vigilante (1950–1996)
- Ricky Rodriguez – American cult victim who murdered childhood sexual abuser (1975–2005)
- Hercules (serial killer)
