= Killings of William Elliott and Joseph Gray =

2006 killings of sex offenders in Maine, United States

- Location: 45°15′1″N 68°58′59″W (Milo); 44°59′10″N 68°59′57″W (Corinth); Maine, U.S.
- Date: April 16, 2006; 20 years ago c. 3:00 a.m. – 8:15 a.m. (CDT; UTC−04:00)
- Target: Convicted sex offenders
- Attack type: Murder–suicide; homicide by shooting; spree shooting
- Weapons: .45 caliber Colt M1911 semi-automatic pistol (Note: All of the weapons had been stolen from the killer's own father); .22 caliber handgun; Colt AR-15-style rifle
- Deaths: 3 (including the perpetrator) (Note: The killer, Stephen Marshall, committed suicide on a bus as police officers boarded it, before he could be apprehended.)
- Perpetrator: Stephen Alexander Marshall
- Motive: Vigilantism

On April 16, 2006, two convicted sex offenders, William Elliott and Joseph Gray, were killed by Stephen Alexander Marshall (August 9, 1985 – April 16, 2006), a 20-year-old American-Canadian man. Marshall had travelled from Nova Scotia to Maine with the intention of killing sex offenders in an act of vigilantism. Using the names and addresses of convicted sex offenders retrieved through searching publicly available sex offender registries in the United States, Marshall drove to the houses of the two men and killed them, before taking his own life in Boston, Massachusetts, when police stopped the bus he was on.

== Killings ==
Out of over 2,000 sex offenders listed on the Maine registry, Marshall took down the information on 34 of them.

On April 13, 2006, Marshall left his North Sydney (now part of Cape Breton Regional Municipality) home in Nova Scotia, driving to visit Houlton, Maine, where his father lived. During his trip, Marshall's car broke down in Sackville, New Brunswick, so he called for his father to pick him up. On the night of April 15, Marshall stole his father's Toyota pickup truck as well as three of his firearms; a .45 automatic M1911 handgun, a .22 caliber handgun, as well as a Colt AR-15-style rifle. Marshall began by driving on Interstate 95 towards the houses of registered sex offenders in LaGrange, some of which he passed, though he continued towards Milo, where, according to police, he likely drove on State Route 16. Throughout the multiple Milo residences of sex offenders that he drove by, Marshall chose the home of 57-year-old Joseph Gray, who, at around 3 a.m. on April 16, was shot and killed through his front window. Marshall had shot and killed Gray while he was sleeping in his living room. Gray's wife woke up to their dogs barking. Gray had fallen asleep to watching Forensic Files prior to his killing. Later that morning, at 8:15 a.m., Marshall arrived at a mobile home in Corinth, where 24-year-old registered sex offender William Elliott resided, and knocked on his door. After Elliot answered, Marshall fatally shot him repeatedly before fleeing, though not before having the license plate of his father's truck recorded by Elliott's girlfriend.

Marshall drove his father's truck to Bangor and abandoned it as well as the rifle that he brought with him. At 1:45 p.m., he boarded a bus headed for Boston, Massachusetts. The Massachusetts Bay Transportation Authority (MBTA) were later notified about Marshall potentially being a passenger by Maine State Police, who helped replace the bus after breaking down around Lewiston a few hours earlier. Shortly before arriving at the South Station in Boston at 8:15 p.m., Massachusetts Bay Transportation Authority Police stopped the bus and boarded it. Before he could be apprehended, Marshall shot himself in the head and died later that night at Boston Medical Center. At the time of his death, Marshall was deemed a person of interest for the shootings. Later investigation of the laptop he had brought with him indicated that he had gone to the residences of four other sex offenders.

== Perpetrator ==
Stephen Marshall in an undated photograph

Stephen Alexander Marshall was born on August 9, 1985, in Fort Worth, Texas, to parents Ralph Arthur Marshall and Margaret Malia Diekelmann. Marshall moved with his family to Cape Breton, Nova Scotia when he was a child. His parents divorced in 1996. In 1999, Marshall moved to Culdesac, Idaho, with his father, Ralph, who served three years as mayor. Marshall was charged with aggravated assault when he was 15, in April 2001, after he brought an AR-15 rifle onto his lawn where two teenagers were fighting. While his father went to live in Arizona, and later Maine, Marshall moved back to his mother's home in Cape Breton during the summer of 2003. He attempted to enlist in the Army, but was rejected because of his asthma.

== Aftermath ==
After his suicide, authorities investigated his computer. They found an animation of Jesus armed with an assault rifle while knocking on someone's door. Police documents show that Marshall’s laptop had folders with information downloaded from sex offender registries. Marshall left some of his belongings at his father's house which included a camouflage backpack with survival gear and three books, "Art of War," "SAS Survival Guide" and a Bible. The killings shocked friends, family and acquaintances of Marshall, who was described as kind and quiet. Though he was described as quiet and reserved, Marshall lashed out at least once, threatening to kill his stepfather when he criticized Marshall for losing a job at a call center, his mother told investigators. His father, Ralph Marshall, reported that his son was planning to move to Maine. Ralph also said that they'd driven around looking at homes just days before the killings. His father also noted that Marshall became a Christian, though he said it was just a week before the killings. At one point, Marshall told his mother that he referred to pedophiles as “low lifes” and "scums of the Earth".

== Cultural depictions ==
In 2018, filmmaker Marc Bisaillon released With Love (L'Amour), a thriller film inspired by Marshall's case.

== See also ==
- List of anti-sex offender attacks in the United States
- Hercules (serial killer)
