= Flirty Fishing =

Religious prostitution method formerly used by the Children of God/Family International

Flirty Fishing (FFing) is a form of evangelism by sexual intimacy practised from around 1974 to 1987 by the cult Children of God, currently known as The Family International (TFI). Female members of Children of God, or "fisherwomen", would apply their sex appeal on "fish" – men from outside the cult (often, but not always, having sex) – using the occasion to proselytize and seek donations.

Children of God have defended it as a way of "bearing witness" for Jesus to people who would not otherwise be open to it. According to some sources, over 200,000 men were "fished" and over 10,000 babies were born to cult women between 1971 and 2001. The practice was curtailed as sexually transmitted diseases spread through the cult, and then abandoned in 1987, reportedly because of the spread of AIDS.

== Etymology, definition, rationale ==
The term is derived from Matthew 4:19 from the New Testament, in which Jesus tells two fishermen that he will make them "fishers of men". Cult leader David Berg extrapolated from this that women in his movement should be "flirty fishers" (also called "bait" or "fisherwomen"). The targeted men were called "fish". The cult published several documents with exact instructions. Flirty Fishing was defined as using sex appeal for proselytizing.

According to The Family's history, "Father David [Berg] arrived at the rather shocking conclusion that Christians were therefore free through God's grace to go to great lengths to show the Love of God to others, even as far as meeting their sexual needs." While acknowledging that this interpretation scandalized "many religious institutions", The Family maintained that "many people, most of whom would never even go near a church, were reached and won to Christ through this very humble, honest, open and intimately human approach to witnessing." A Family spokesman John Francis describes the main "fish" involved as "lonely traveling businessmen" staying in hotels.

== Practice ==
The Children of God practised flirty fishing and escort servicing from 1974 until 1987, when it was officially abandoned in part because of the AIDS epidemic.

Researcher Bill Bainbridge obtained data from TFI suggesting that, from 1974 until 1987, members had sexual contact with 223,989 people while practicing Flirty Fishing. Though the cult had no problem ignoring Christian norms on fornication, it did follow Christian beliefs when it came to birth control, sources differ on whether birth control was forbidden or simply discouraged. According to Don Lattin, between 1971 and 2001 "more than 13,000" children were born to followers of David Berg; "women with six, eight, 10, 13 kids were not uncommon" in the Family. The "first child conceived through 'flirty fishing', was born to Berg’s common-law wife, Karen Zerby", but was fathered by "a waiter she picked up in the Canary Islands".

Ex-member and critic, David Hiebert, states the practice was "used to curry political favor" in countries CoG had migrated to. "They would target special people—in the media, lawyers, in the government." According to James Chancellor,

Witnessing and disciple winning were by no means the only focus of Flirty Fishing. Even before 1978, FFing had become a primary source of financial support and political protection. Many female disciples established long-term relationships with wealthy or influential men. These men often provided money, food, clothing, housing, and other needs, including legal advice, help in immigration, and protection against social and political repression. It was not uncommon for some women to spend considerable amounts of time with their "fish", sometimes leaving their husbands and children for weeks or months at a time.

=== ESing ===
The financial benefit of Flirty Fishing soon advanced from mere flirting/"loving sexually", to "escort servicing" (ESing)—described as "making FFing pay" by Berg—in which female cult members would work as regular call girls for escort agencies or freelance, and "witness" (proselytize) to their clients merely when the occasion offered itself.

According to author James Chancellor,

In some areas of Asia, Europe and Latin America, female disciples went to work for escort services, providing sex for a fixed fee. Though conceding that escort service work (ESing) perhaps crossed the line, Family leadership insists that Flirty Fishing was not prostitution because the ultimate goal was always to bear witness or support the witness for Jesus.

== Impact on members and criticism ==
Critical ex-members of CoG also point to Family publications from this period. A 1987 "Basic Training Handbook" offers "explicit advice on sex among prepubescent teens. There's also something called 'My Little Fish' containing nude photographs of a young boy and an adult woman embracing."

Flirty Fishing has been compared to prostitution. One scholar, (Susan Raine) describes its "terminology and ... imagery" as "saturated with the rhetoric of prostitution". Describing a couple of images from internal Children of God literature on FFing sent by Berg to Children of God communes and later released by ex-members, Raine says one is "of a woman wearing hot pants, a bra, and high-heeled boots ... dangling a fishhook from her hand ... the caption below reads 'FISHERS OF MEN!'". Another "portrays a woman as a mermaid impaled on a hook, but embracing a man, this time with the heading 'HOOKER FOR JESUS'" (One "Mo Letter" written by David Berg and distributed to members of CoG was entitled "God's Whores?").

== See also ==
- Love bombing
- Love jihad
