= Juliana Buhring =

British-German ultra-endurance cyclist and writer

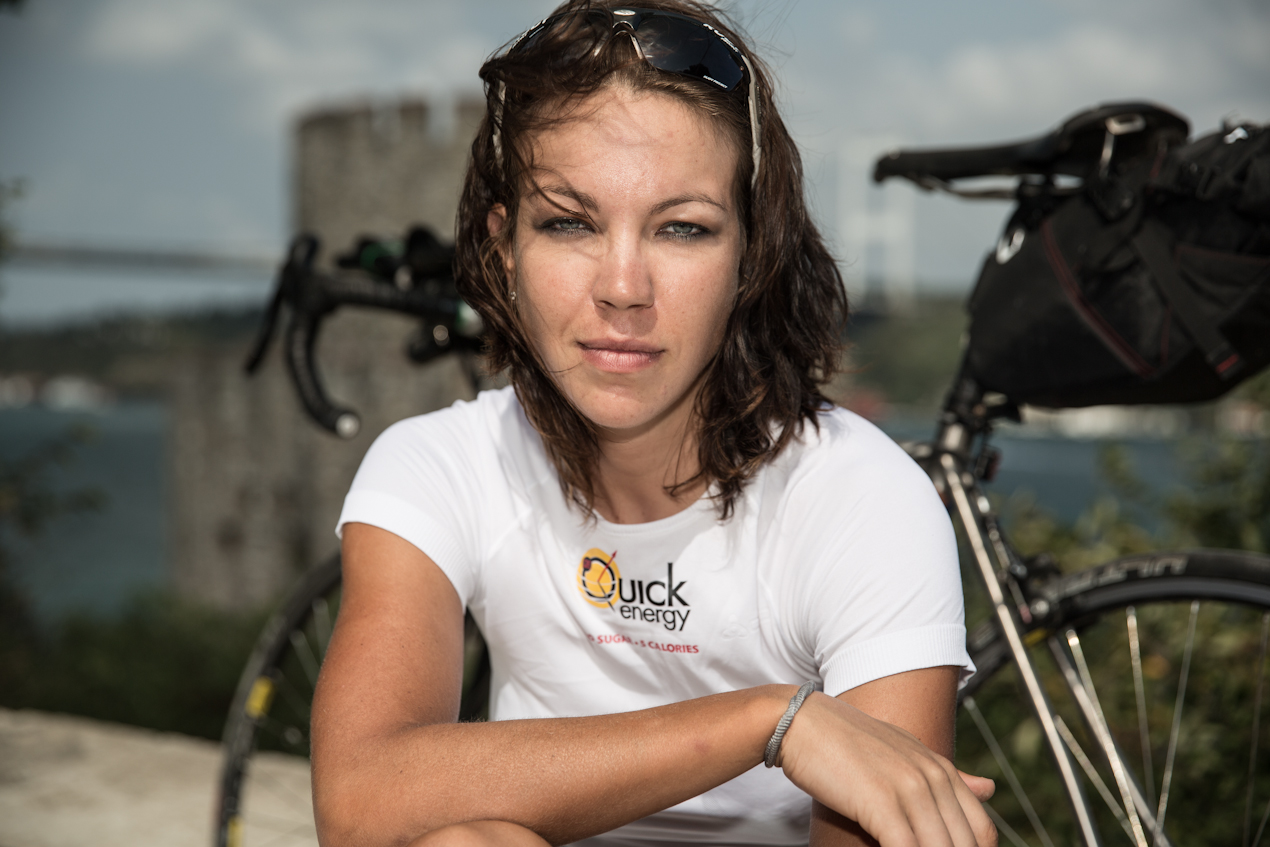
- Born: 2 June 1981 (age 44); Athens, Greece
- Occupations: Endurance cyclist and writer
- Known for: Guinness World Record holder
- Website: julianabuhring.com

Juliana Buhring (born 2 June 1981) is a British-German ultra-endurance cyclist and writer. In December 2012, she set the first Guinness World Record as the fastest woman to circumnavigate the globe by bike, riding over 29,000 kilometres (18,000 mi) in a total time of 152 days (144 actual days in the saddle).

Buhring was the only woman to participate in the inaugural Transcontinental Race from London to Istanbul in 2013, finishing in 9th place overall. In 2014, she won the first edition of the Trans Am Bike Race (women) and 4th place overall. In 2018, Buhring won the women's category and came third overall in the inaugural self-supported Bikingman Oman Sprint. She started cycling for the first time in 2011 at the age of 30, and is now considered one of the strongest female ultra-endurance cyclists in the world.

Juliana Buhring is co-author of Not Without My Sister, an international best-seller translated into 11 languages, detailing her life growing up within the Children of God and author of This Road I Ride, an account of her world cycle ride.

Buhring is Race Director for the Two Volcano Sprint (2VS), a single-stage, unsupported bicycle challenge starting and finishing at southern Italy's two iconic volcanoes, Mount Vesuvius and Mount Etna. The event promotes and sponsors projects, initiatives or services that positively impact nature preservation, environmental sustainability, or climate action while boosting economic growth for local communities in south Italy.

== Biography ==
Buhring was born in Athens, Greece on 2 June 1981. Her parents were members of the Children of God cult (now known as "The Family International"). Buhring was abandoned by her parents at the age of four years and fostered out to different guardians within the group. She moved frequently throughout her childhood, living in nearly 30 countries across Asia, Africa and Europe. The question of her nationality is complex. Although when asked, Buhring states she is German, because of her mother's ancestry, she never lived in Germany. In 2004, after the death of her sister Davida, Buhring left the group. In 2006, she reunited with her two sisters, Kristina and Celeste Jones. Together they wrote a book exposing the inner workings of the group they were born into. Not Without My Sister became a best seller in the UK, Ireland and Australia. Together with her sisters, Buhring founded Rise International, which later merged with Safe Passage Foundation, helping children born and raised in religious sects or isolated and extremist groups. Her second book, This Road I Ride recounts her adventure around the world by bicycle.

== World cycle record ==
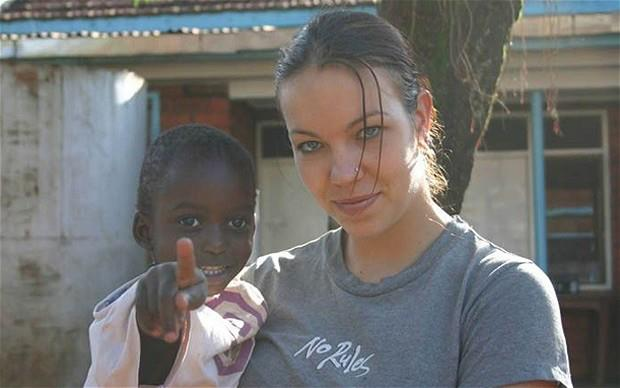
Buhring in Uganda

Looking for a way to raise money and awareness for Safe Passage Foundation, Buhring decided to cycle the world. After eight months of training, she left from Naples on 23 July 2012, without sponsorship and support, and with little money. Her limited funds ran out while in New Zealand, and Buhring's numerous online followers started a regular chain of donations that kept her going around the world. After a total of 152 days (144 in the saddle), Buhring returned to Naples where a crowd of supporters followed her to finish line in Piazza Plebiscito. She travelled through 19 countries and 4 continents, covering 29,000 kilometres (18,000 mi), and making the first woman's record for circumnavigating the globe by bicycle in the Guinness Book of Records.

== Transcontinental Race ==
Having completed the world cycle, Buhring looked for a new challenge. In 2013, she participated in the inaugural Transcontinental Race, founded by fellow world cyclist and record holder, Mike Hall. Known as the toughest unsupported race across Europe, the first edition started in London and ended in Istanbul, crossing the high cols of the Alps. Buhring was the only woman in the race, finishing in 12 days and in 9th position.

== Trans Am Bike Race ==
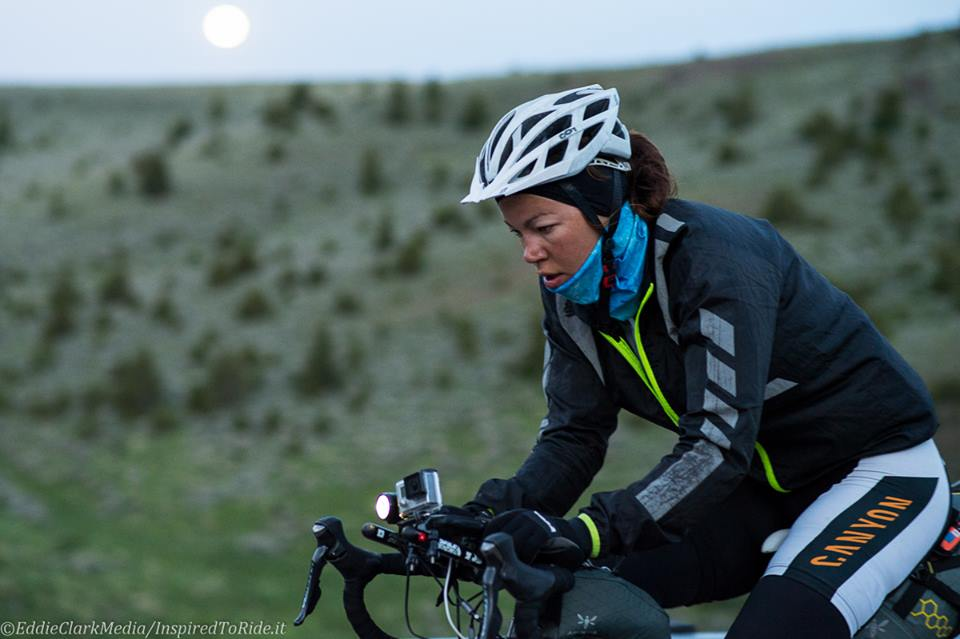
Trans Am

In June 2014, Buhring raced the inaugural Trans Am Bike Race in the US. Starting in Astoria, Oregon, and finishing in Yorktown, Virginia, the race is 4,400 miles (7,100 km) long, with a total of around 51,000 metres (167,000 ft) of climbing. As in the Transcontinental Race, cyclists must ride unsupported and be self-sufficient. This race included some of the world's top endurance riders, including Mike Hall, winner of the Tour Divide and former world record-holder as the fastest man to circumnavigate the globe. Buhring finished the race in 20 days, coming first in the women's category and tying for 4th place overall. The part of her ride included an unbroken ride of 36 hours covering 500 miles (800 km) in her final sprint. Her performance attracted the attention of various magazines, and she was rated by the now defunct Women's Cycling Magazine as one of the strongest female endurance cyclists in the world.

== Oman Sprint ==
In February 2018, Buhring won the women's category and came third overall in the inaugural self-supported Bikingman Oman Sprint. She rode 1,070 kilometres non-stop, finishing in 49 hours and 53 minutes.

== Films/Documentaries ==
A feature-length documentary, called Inspired to Ride was made about the 2014 TransAm Bicycle Race. In addition to several interviews during the race with Buhring, the documentary included a section where Buhring was interviewed and filmed riding in Naples, Italy.

== Books ==
Buhring's first book, Not Without My Sister, was written with her two sisters, Celeste and Kristina Jones, and published in 2007. The book details their lives growing up in the Children of God group. It was number 1 on the Sunday Times best-seller list for 5 weeks, and remained in the top 10 list for 15 consecutive weeks. It has been translated into ten languages.

Her second book, This Road I Ride, published by WWNorton and Piaktus in 2016, describes her record-breaking journey around the world by bicycle.
