= Not Without My Sister =

2007 memoir

- Author: Juliana Buhring, Celeste Jones, Kristina Jones
- Language: English
- Subject: Child abuse, memoirs, autobiography
- Publisher: Harper Element (HarperCollins)
- Publication date: 2 July 2007
- Publication place: United Kingdom
- Media type: Print (Hardcover, Paperback)
- Pages: 416 pp
- ISBN: 0-007-24806-7
- OCLC: 181923764

Not Without My Sister is a 2007 best-selling book written by sisters Kristina Jones, Celeste Jones, and Juliana Buhring. The book details their life, and eventual escape, from the Children of God group.

It was number 1 on the Sunday Times best-seller list for 5 weeks, and remained in the top 10 list for 15 consecutive weeks. It has been translated into nine languages.
