= The Family International =

1968 American new religious movement

- Abbreviation: TFI
- Type: Christian cult
- Classification: Christianity
- Leader: David Berg (1968–1994); Karen Zerby (1994–2025)
- Language: English
- Founder: David Berg
- Origin: 1968; Huntington Beach, California
- Branched from: The Family
- Other names: Teens for Christ; The Children of God (1968–1978); The Family of Love (1978–1982); The Family (1982–2004)
- Official website: thefamilyinternational.org

The Family International (TFI) is an American new religious movement founded in 1968 by David Brandt Berg. The group has gone under a number of different names since its inception, including Teens for Christ, The Children of God (COG), The Family of Love, or simply The Family.

A British court case found the group to be an authoritarian cult that engaged in the systematic physical and sexual abuse of children, resulting in lasting trauma among survivors. The group has also been accused of targeting vulnerable people. As of the 2010s, the group was still active and involved in missionary work internationally.

== Overview ==
According to the Canadian Broadcasting Corporation, "at its height" the Family movement had "tens of thousands of members, including River and Joaquin Phoenix, Rose McGowan, and Jeremy Spencer". TFI initially spread a message of salvation, apocalypticism, spiritual "revolution and happiness", and distrust of the outside world, which the members called The System. Like some other evangelical Christian groups, it "foretold the coming of a dictator called the anti-Christ, the rise of a brutal One World Government, and its eventual overthrow by Jesus Christ, in the Second Coming".

In 1976, TFI began a method of evangelism called Flirty Fishing that used sex to "show God's love and mercy" and win converts, resulting in controversy. TFI's founder and prophetic leader, David Berg—who adopted the name "Moses David" while in the Laurentides in Canada, and was also referred to "Father David" by members—gave himself the titles of "King", "The Last Endtime Prophet", "Moses", and "David".

Berg communicated with his followers via "Mo Letters"—letters of instruction and counsel on myriad spiritual and practical subjects—until his death in late 1994. After his death, his widow Karen Zerby became the leader of TFI, taking the titles of "Queen" and "Prophetess". Zerby married Steve Kelly (also known as Peter Amsterdam), an assistant of Berg's whom Berg had handpicked as her "consort". Kelly took the title of "King Peter" and became the face of TFI, speaking in public more often than either Berg or Zerby. There have been multiple allegations of child sexual abuse made by past members, including against Zerby.

Berg preached a combination of traditional Christian evangelism, with elements popular with the counterculture of the 1960s. There was much "end-of-the-world imagery" found in the Book of Revelation of the New Testament, preaching of impending doom for America and the ineffectiveness of established churches. Berg "urged a return to the early Christian community described in the Bible's Book of Acts, in which believers lived together and shared all," resembling the communal living of late 1960s hippies.

== History ==
=== The Children of God (1968–1977) ===
The founder of the movement, David Brandt Berg (1919–1994), was a former pastor in the Christian and Missionary Alliance, an evangelical Protestant denomination. Berg started in 1968 as an evangelical preacher with a following of "born-again hippies" who gathered at a coffeehouse in Huntington Beach, in Orange County, California. In 1969, after having a revelation "that California would be hit by a major earthquake", he left Huntington Beach and "took his followers on the road".

They would proselytize in the streets and distribute pamphlets. Leaders within The Children of God (COG) were referred to as The Chain. Members of COG founded communes, first called colonies (now referred to as homes), in various cities.

Around the end of 1969, about 200 members of the COG group established a 425-acre "colony" several miles from Thurber, Texas – a ghost town. This acreage was owned by the American Soul Clinic.

By 1971, the COG claimed that it had 4,000 members, mostly consisting of teenagers and people in early 20s. In November 1971, COG's colony was evicted after a serious disagreement with American Soul Clinic's head Fred Jordan and other associates.

Berg communicated with his followers by writing letters. He published nearly 3,000 letters over a period of 24 years, referred to as the Mo Letters. In a letter written in January 1972, Berg stated that he was God's prophet for the contemporary world, attempting to further solidify his spiritual authority within the group. Berg's letters also contained public acknowledgement of his own failings and weaknesses, for example, he issued a Mo Letter entitled "My confession – I was an alcoholic!" (ML #1406 Summer 1982) relating his depression after some of his closest supporters quit in 1978.

In 1972, a Mo Letter reportedly entitled "Flee as a Bird to Your Mountain" was interpreted by some members, including Ruth Gordon, author of Children of Darkness about the cult, as a warning to leave America. "God was going to destroy the U.S. ... and we had to get out." This, along with the pressure members felt that parents were trying to "rescue" children who had joined CoG, encouraged members to "[migrate] abroad—first to Europe, eventually to Latin America and East Asia".

By 1972, COG stated it had 130 communities around the world, and by the mid-1970s, it had "colonies" in an estimated 70 countries. BBC reported 10,000 full-time COG members in the 1970s.

In 1974, the NY Attorney General's Office called the COG a "cult". Investigations by the FBI and Interpol were underway and hunted for Berg. One informant had spoken of rape, imprisonment, kidnapping, as well as incest inside the group. The investigations, however, ended in 1994 when Berg died.

In 1976, Berg introduced a new proselytizing method called Flirty Fishing (or FFing), which encouraged female members to "show God's love" through sexual relationships (religious prostitution) with potential converts. Flirty Fishing was practiced by members of Berg's inner circle starting in 1973, and was introduced to the general membership in 1976.

=== The Family of Love (1978–1981) ===
The Children of God was abolished in February 1978, and Berg renamed his group "The Family of Love" In what Berg called the "Re-organization Nationalization Revolution" (or RNR). Berg reorganized the movement, dismissing "more than 300 leading members after hearing unspecified 'reports of serious misconduct and abuse of their positions." Reportedly involved were The Chain's abuse of authority, and disagreements within it about the continued use of Flirty Fishing. The group was also accused of sexually abusing and raping minors within the organization, with considerable evidence to support this claim. One eighth of the total membership left the movement. Those who remained became part of a reorganized movement called the Family of Love, and later, The Family. The majority of the group's beliefs remained the same.

The Family of Love period was characterized by international expansion.

After 1978 Flirty Fishing "increased drastically" and became common practice within the group. A Mo Letter from 1980 (ML #999 May 1980) for example was headlined "The Devil Hates Sex! – But God Loves It!". In some areas flirty fishers used escort agencies to meet potential converts. According to TFI "over 100,000 received God's gift of salvation through Jesus, and some chose to live the life of a disciple and missionary" as a result of Flirty Fishing. Researcher Bill Bainbridge obtained data from TFI suggesting that, from 1974 until 1987, members had sexual contact with 223,989 people while practicing Flirty Fishing.

=== The Family (1982–1994) ===
According to the Family's official history, the group had "far fewer common standards of conduct" during The Family of Love stage than it had previously. In the late 1980s the group "tightened its standards" "to ensure that all member communities provide a very wholesome environment for all, particularly the children", and changed its name to "The Family". In March 1989, TF issued a statement that, in "early 1985", an urgent memorandum had been sent to all members "reminding them that any such activities [adult–child sexual contact] are strictly forbidden within our group" (emphasis in original), and such activities were grounds for immediate excommunication from the group. In January 2005, Claire Borowik, a spokesperson for TFI, stated:

Due to the fact that our current zero-tolerance policy regarding sexual interaction between adults and underage minors was not in our literature published before 1986, we came to the realization that during a transitional stage of our movement, from 1978 until 1986, there were cases when some minors were subject to sexually inappropriate advances ... This was corrected officially in 1986, when any contact between an adult and minor (any person under 21 years of age) was declared an excommunicable offense.

After a 1993 expose in the Los Angeles Times, the group broke "years of virtual silence" and began "inviting reporters and religious scholars" to visit its commune in La Habra, California, where Washington Post journalist Gustav Niebuhr found its members to be "a clean-cut bunch, friendly and courteous". At that time The Family claimed to have "about 9,000 members worldwide, with about 750 scattered across the United States". The group emphasized its mainstream Christian opposition to abortion, homosexuality, drugs and drunkenness and its respect for Rev. Billy Graham.

Internationally, the Family had been subject to police investigations and prosecutions during this period for child protection and morality offenses. Investigations are known to have occurred in Argentina, Australia, England, France, Italy, Norway, Peru, Spain and Sweden. In Argentina and Australia, children were taken into state custody for protection, then released after examination.

=== The Family (1995–2003) ===
After Berg's death in October 1994, Karen Zerby (known in the group as Mama Maria, Queen Maria, Maria David, or Maria Fontaine) assumed leadership of the group.

In February 1995, the group introduced the Love Charter, which defined the rights and responsibilities of Charter Members and Homes. The Charter also included the Fundamental Family Rules, a summary of rules and guidelines from past TF publications which were still in effect.

In the 1994–95 British court case, the Rt. Hon. Lord Justice Alan Ward ruled that the group, including some of its top leaders, had in the past engaged in abusive sexual practices involving minors and had also used severe corporal punishment and sequestration of minors. He found that by 1995 TF had abandoned these practices and concluded that they were a safe environment for children. Nevertheless, he did require that the group cease all corporal punishment of children in the United Kingdom and denounce any of Berg's writings that were "responsible for children in TF having been subjected to sexually inappropriate behaviour".

=== The Family International (since 2004) ===
The Love Charter is The Family's set governing document that entails each member's rights, responsibilities and requirements, while the Missionary Member Statutes and Fellow Member Statutes were written for the governance of TFI's Missionary member and Fellow Member circles, respectively. FD Homes were reviewed every six months against a published set of criteria. The Love Charter increased the number of single family homes as well as homes that relied on jobs such as self-employment.

==== Teachings ====
TFI's teachings have become based on beliefs which they term the "new [spiritual] weapons". TFI members believe that they are soldiers in the spiritual war of good versus evil for the souls and hearts of men.

==== Spirit Helpers ====
"Spirit Helpers" include angels, other religious and mythical figures, and departed humans, including celebrities; for example the goddess Aphrodite, the Snowman, Merlin, the Sphinx, Elvis, Marilyn Monroe, Audrey Hepburn, Richard Nixon, and Winston Churchill.

==== The Keys of the Kingdom ====
TFI believes that the Biblical passage "I will give you the keys of the kingdom of heaven, and whatsoever you bind on earth will be bound in heaven, and whatsoever you loose on earth will be loosed in heaven" (Matthew 16:19), refers to an increasing amount of spiritual authority that was given to Peter and the early disciples. According to TFI beliefs, this passage refers to keys that were hidden and unused in the centuries that followed, but were again revealed through Karen Zerby as more power to pray and obtain miracles. TFI members call on the various Keys of the Kingdom for extra effect during prayer. The Keys, like most TFI beliefs, were published in magazines that looked like comic-books in order to make them teachable to children.

==== Loving Jesus ====
"Loving Jesus" is a term TFI members use to describe their intimate, sexual relationship with Jesus. TFI describes its "Loving Jesus" teaching as a radical form of bridal theology. They believe the church of followers is Christ's bride, called to love and serve him with wifely fervor; however, this bridal theology is taken further, encouraging members to imagine Jesus is joining them during sexual intercourse and masturbation. Male members are cautioned to visualize themselves as women, in order to avoid a homosexual relationship with Jesus. Many TFI publications, and spirit messages claimed to be from Jesus himself, elaborate this intimate, sexual relation they believe Jesus desires and needs. TFI imagines itself as his special "bride" in graphic poetry, guided visualizations, artwork, and songs. Some TFI literature is not brought into conservative countries for fear it may be classified at customs as pornography. The literature outlining this view of Jesus and his desire for a sexual relationship with believers was edited for younger teens, then further edited for children.

== Criticism and accusations of sexual assault ==
The Family has been found liable in a British court, and also criticized by the press and the anti-cult movement. Ex-members have accused the Family's leadership of following "a policy of lying to outsiders", being "steeped in a history of sexual deviance" and even meddling "in Third World politics". The Family replies that it is a victim of persecution.

Some of those who have left the group have said that they were abused and mistreated while part of the group; examples include sisters Celeste Jones, Kristina Jones, and Juliana Buhring and Daniella Mestyanek Young, who both wrote books on their lives in TFI.

In 1971, an organization called FREECOG was founded by concerned parents and others, including deprogrammer Ted Patrick to free members of the COG from their involvement in the group.

At least one individual growing up in the family (Verity Carter) during the Children of God era described being sexually abused "from the age of four by members of the... cult, including her own father". She blames the philosophy of David Berg, who told members that "God was love and love was sex", so that sex should not be limited by age or relationship. Carter also complains of being "repeatedly beaten and whipped for the smallest of transgressions", being denied "music or television or culture", or other "contact with the outside world", so that she had "no idea how the world worked" other than how to manipulate the "systemites" (outsiders), like social workers.

Author Don Lattin interviewed numerous members of the Family for his book Jesus Freaks. In a review of his book, Paul Burgarino describes Berg as "drawing from the remnants of hippie life—people with nothing to lose, nowhere to go, and no Christian background" to alert them to deviations in Berg's preaching. One ex–Children of God member, Jerry Golland, describes himself at the time of joining the group as penniless and so depressed that the Children of God scraped him "off the street". Members would "learn to spot, you know... a vulnerable person. We called them sheep", Golland told the Canadian Broadcasting Corporation.

Pressure to raise money could also be intense. Ex-member Golland says that members who were good at raising money and distributing the pamphlets were called "Shiners". Those with poor sales were called "Shamers". "If you missed your quota you could not come home for dinner", he said.

== Media produced by the group ==
The Family International produced multiple pop songs and music videos along with comic books, known as True Komix. One notable song released in 1985 was Cathy Don't Go, about a woman who goes to the supermarket where customers have barcodes on their hands and foreheads, and who almost gets implanted with a 666 microchip. The cult also created children's shows, with an example being Life With Grandpa, which had characters based on Berg and his family, and featured sexual themes alongside Christianity-related life lessons.

== Notable members (past and present) ==
=== Joined in adulthood ===
- Jeremy Spencer, blues slide guitarist and a founding member of Fleetwood Mac, which he left in 1971 when he joined TFI.

=== Raised in the COG and later left ===
- Christopher Owens: musician, of US indie band Girls, was brought up in TFI by his parents.
- Rose McGowan: film actress, described her TFI childhood in interviews with Howard Stern, People magazine, and later in her book Brave.
- River Phoenix, Joaquin Phoenix, Rain Phoenix, Liberty Phoenix, and Summer Phoenix, actors, were members of the group from 1972 to 1978. River Phoenix, who died of a drug overdose in 1993, told Details magazine in November 1991 that "they're ruining people's lives."
- Susan Justice: American pop rock singer-songwriter and guitarist, known best for her debut self-recorded album, The Subway Recordings.
- Tina Dupuy: American journalist and syndicated columnist.
- Ricky Rodriguez: In 2005, he committed a murder-suicide, killing one of the women who raised and sexually abused him, then himself.
- Davida Kelley: eldest daughter of Sara Kelley, who was David Berg's nanny and raised Davida and Ricky Rodriguez in a highly abusive environment. Davida has been outspoken about the group's abuse in public media such as Larry King Live and accused Berg of sexually abusing her as a child in a June 2005 Rolling Stone article.
- Juliana Buhring: first woman to bicycle around the world and co-author of Not Without My Sister along with Celeste and Kristina Jones.
- Lauren Hough: author of Leaving Isn't the Hardest Thing, brought up in TFI.
- Flor Edwards, author, who was raised inside the group before her parents moved out.
- Dawn Watson: victim of sexual abuse while living in a TFI community.
- Taylor Stevens: author, raised in the group from age 12 until she left in her 20s with her two children.
- Bexy Cameron: British child member who left aged 15 and later wrote a book about her experiences.
- Faith Jones: a lawyer, was raised in the group in Macau before leaving. She wrote about her life in the book Sex Cult Nun.
- Daniella Mestyanek Young: A former army intelligence officer, Harvard graduate, and author of multiple books relating to cults and how to avoid and free yourself from them.

== Autobiographical accounts ==
- Davis, Deborah (Linda Berg) (1984). THE CHILDREN OF GOD: The Inside Story. Zondervan Books, Grand Rapids, Michigan. ISBN 0-310-27840-6. Expose by the founder's eldest daughter who left the cult.
- Connolly, Ray (2011). Something Somebody Stole. CreateSpace Independent Publishing Platform. ISBN 978-1460922545. Expose by a senior member who left after 20+ years.
- Young, Daniella Mestyanek (2022). Uncultured: A Memoir. St. Martin's Publishing. ISBN 978-1250280114. Young was born and raised in The Children of God cult. She's the eldest daughter of a second generation cult member who was 14 when she was impregnated by an older cult member.
- Hough, Lauren (2021). Leaving Isn't the Hardest Thing. Vintage. ISBN 978-0593080764. Hough was born and raised in the Children of God. Her 2021 essay collection is a New York Times Bestseller.
- Bulwer, Perry (2023). Misguided: My Jesus Freak Life in a Doomsday Cult. New Star Books. ISBN 978-1554202058. At age 16, Bulwer ran away to join the Children of God, escaping twenty years later in 1991. He became an advocate for second-generation survivors of the cult's child abuse and psychological trauma.
  - Drake, Kitty (January 10, 2026). "My cultural awakening: Losing My Religion by REM helped me escape a doomsday cult (as told by Perry Bulwer)". The Guardian.
- Mahoney, Mary (2020). Abnormal Normal: My Life in the Children of God. CreateSpace Independent Publishing Platform. ISBN 979-8631746060. Mahoney, a member for 31 years, tells her story, focusing on how her sense of what was normal was altered within the insular world of a cult.

== Media reports about the group ==
- The Jesus Trip (1971): a documentary by Denis Tuohy that has interviews with Children of God members.
- Let There Be Love (1986, 誰來愛我們) - Aired on TVB Jade Channel in Hong Kong.
- Children of God (1994): a 63-minute Channel 4 documentary by John Smithson; detailing the Padilla family and the abuse of their three underage daughters and the death of another.
- Children of God: Lost and Found: a 75-minute documentary by Noah Thomson, featured at the 2007 Slamdance Film Festival.
- Cult Killer: The Rick Rodriguez Story: a 53-minute UK documentary with a transcript.
- In the first episode of Louis Theroux's Weird Weekends, "Born Again Christians", Louis visits a Texas TFI family.
- The Parcast Podcast Cults: Episodes 11 and 12.
- Citizen Rose: A five part documentary series shown on the E! Channel. The first episode premiered on January 30, 2018. The series follows actress Rose McGowan who was born into the cult.
- The Last Podcast on the Left did a four part series on the cult: Episodes 248-251
- Dan Cummins' podcast Timesuck covered the cult in episode 104, "The Children of God Sex Cult".
- AJJ released a song entitled "Children of God" on their 2014 album Christmas Island.
- A&E's Cults and Extreme Belief, episode 3 (2018) is about the Children of God.
- Cool Zone Media's Behind the Bastards PodCast did a two part series on "David Berg and The Children of God" with guest Ed Helms.

== See also ==
- Comet Kohoutek was thought by David Berg to be a prophetic sign of imminent disaster.
- Jim Palosaari, part of the Jesus People Army, left it before the group joined the Children of God, and tried to convince Linda Meissner not to join it.
- Love bombing describes a manipulative style of recruitment.
- Panton Hill, Victoria, Australia is the location of one of the communes, where a large government raid removed many children.
