= 7th Independent Spirit Awards =

US film awards ceremony in 1992

- Date: March 28, 1992
- Site: Raleigh Studios, U.S.
- Hosted by: Buck Henry

Highlights
- Best Film: Rambling Rose
- Most awards: Rambling Rose (3); My Own Private Idaho (3)
- Most nominations: My Own Private Idaho (6); Hangin' with the Homeboys (6)

The 7th Independent Spirit Awards, honoring the best in independent filmmaking for 1991, was announced on March 28, 1992. It was hosted by Buck Henry in a large tent at Raleigh Studios.

== Winners and nominees ==
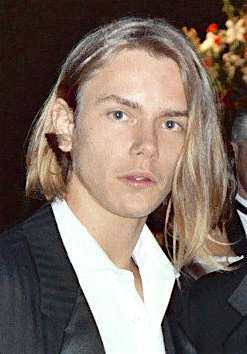
River Phoenix, Best Male Lead winner

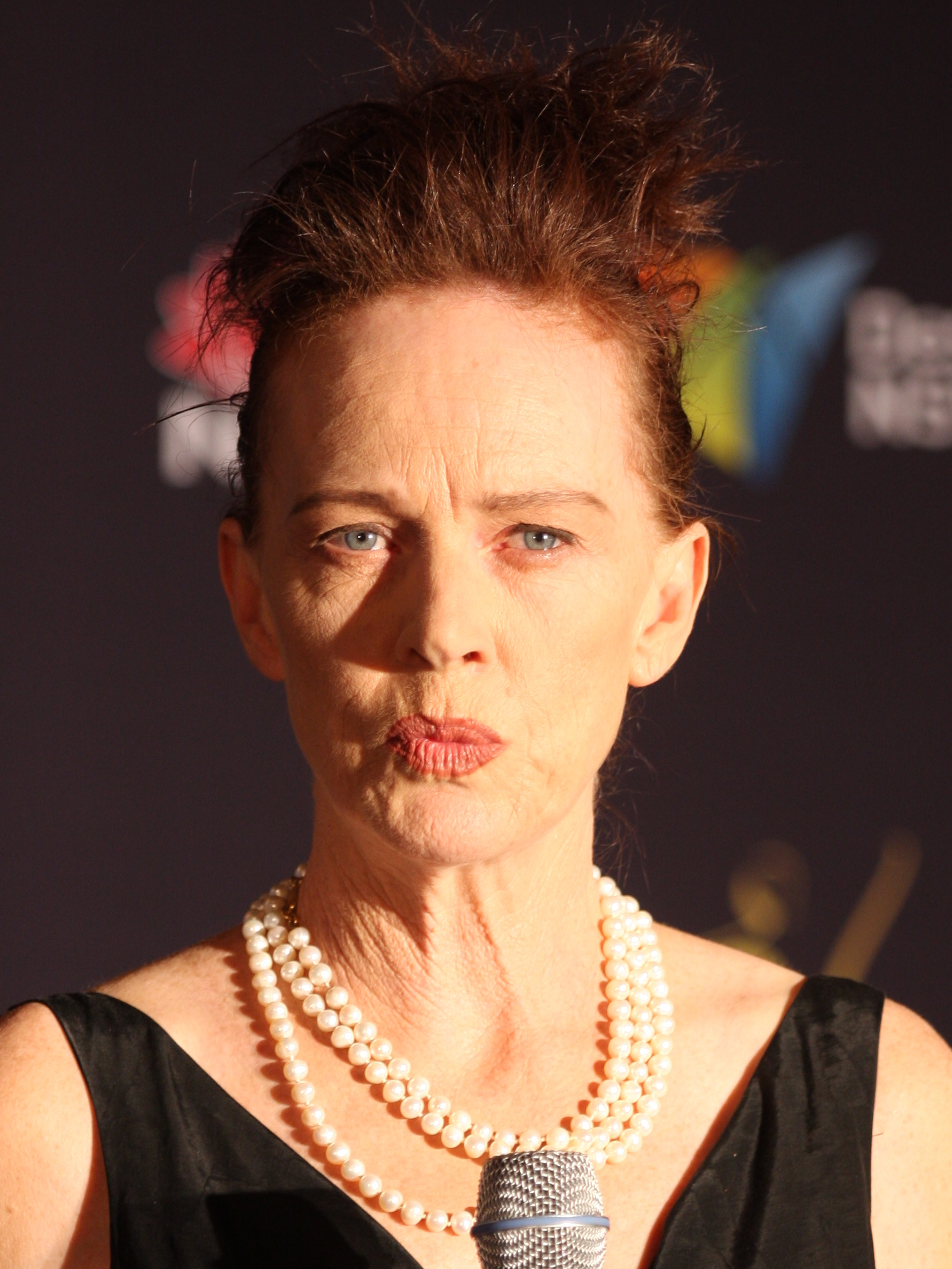
Judy Davis, Best Female Lead winner

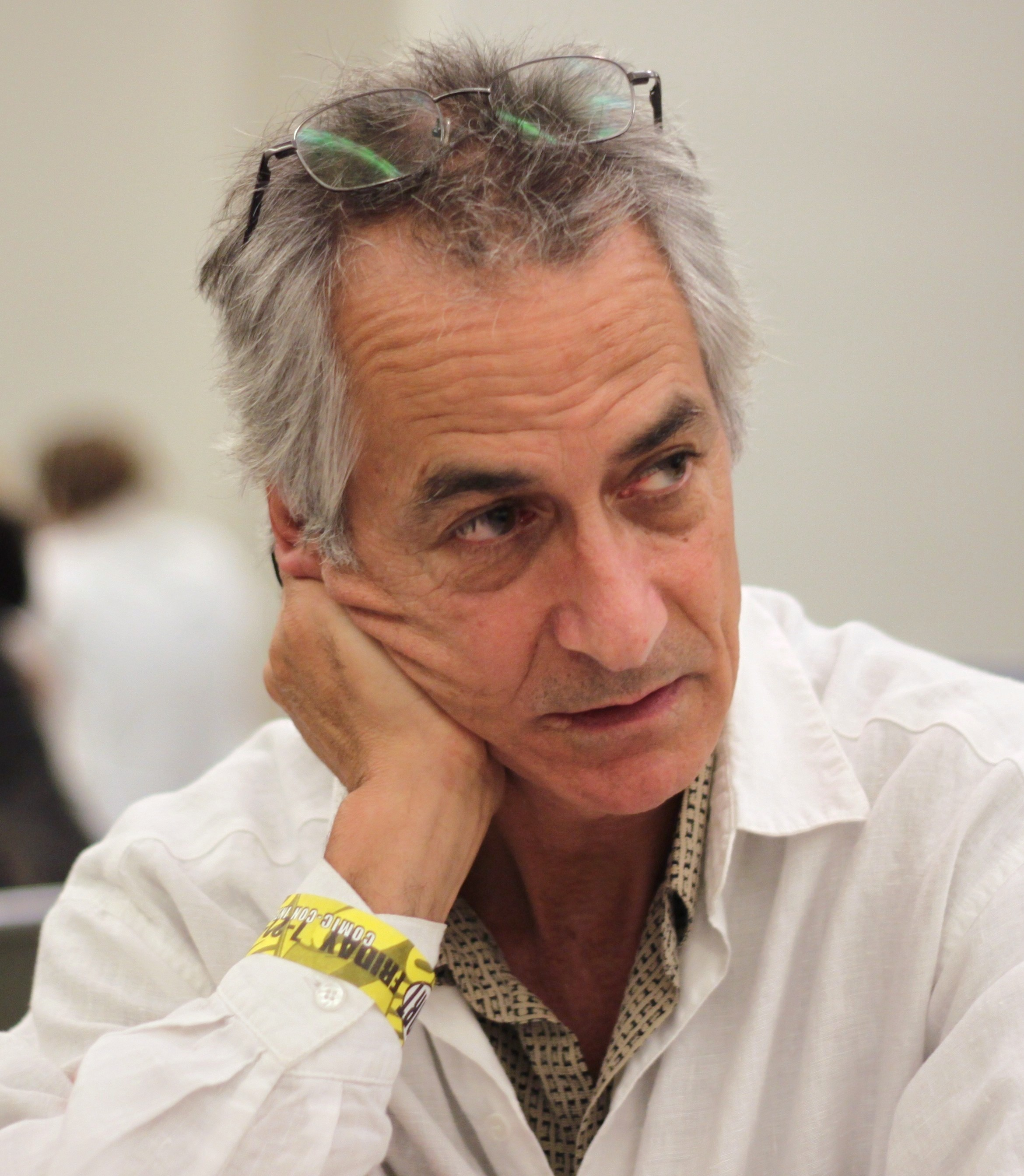
David Strathairn, Best Supporting Male winner

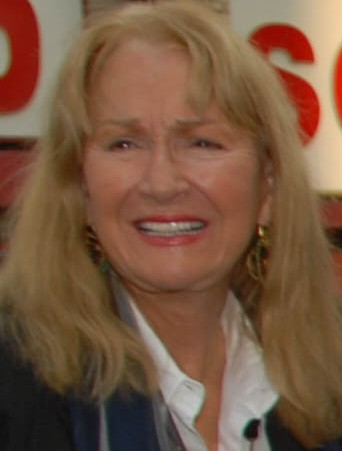
Diane Ladd, Best Supporting Female winner

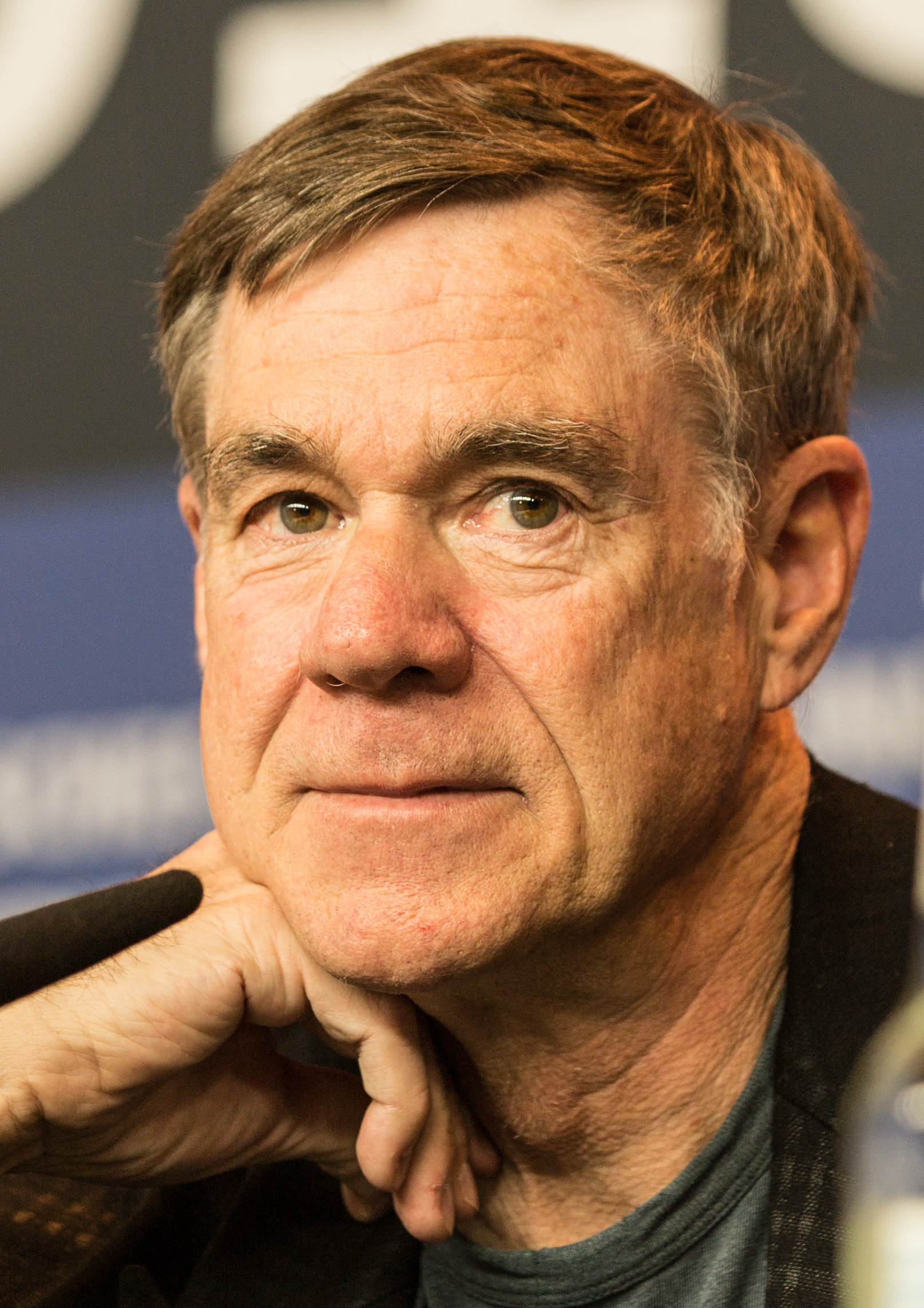
Gus Van Sant, Best Screenplay winner

Best Feature	Best Director
Rambling Rose: City of Hope; Hangin' with the Homeboys; Homicide; My Own Private Idaho	Martha Coolidge – Rambling Rose: Todd Haynes – Poison; Richard Linklater – Slacker; Gus Van Sant – My Own Private Idaho; Joseph Vásquez – Hangin' with the Homeboys
Best Male Lead	Best Female Lead
River Phoenix – My Own Private Idaho: Doug E. Doug – Hangin' with the Homeboys; Robert Duvall – Rambling Rose; Gary Oldman – Rosencrantz & Guildenstern Are Dead; William Russ – Pastime	Judy Davis – Impromptu: Patsy Kensit – Twenty-One; Mimi Rogers – The Rapture; Lili Taylor – Bright Angel; Lily Tomlin – The Search for Signs of Intelligent Life in the Universe
Best Supporting Male	Best Supporting Female
David Strathairn – City of Hope: William H. Macy – Homicide; John Malkovich – Queens Logic; George T. Odom – Straight Out of Brooklyn; Glenn Plummer – Pastime	Diane Ladd – Rambling Rose: Sheila McCarthy – Bright Angel; Deirdre O'Connell – Pastime; Emma Thompson – Impromptu; Mary B. Ward – Hangin' with the Homeboys
Best Screenplay	Best First Feature
My Own Private Idaho – Gus Van Sant: Hangin' with the Homeboys – Joseph Vásquez; Kafka – Lem Dobbs; Mindwalk – Floyd Byars and Fritjof Capra; The Rapture – Michael Tolkin	Straight Out of Brooklyn: Chameleon Street - Wendell B. Harris Jr.; Poison - Todd Haynes; The Rapture - Michael Tolkin; Slacker - Richard Linklater
Best Cinematography	Best Music
Kafka – Walt Lloyd: Homicide – Roger Deakins; My Own Private Idaho – Eric Alan Edwards and John J. Campbell; Pastime – Tom Richmond; Rambling Rose – Johnny E. Jensen	My Own Private Idaho – Bill Stafford: Hangin' with the Homeboys – David Chackler and Joel Sill; Kiss Me a Killer – Marcos Loya and Nigel Holton; A Matter of Degrees – Jim Dunbar and Randall Poster; Straight Out of Brooklyn – Harold Wheeler
Best International Film
An Angel at My Table • Australia/New Zealand/UK: The Double Life of Veronique • France/Norway/Poland; Life Is Sweet • UK; Requiem for Dominic • Austria/France/Romania; Taxi Blues • Soviet Union

=== Presenters ===
Danny Aiello, Jacqueline Bisset, Sofia Coppola, Johnny Depp, Larry Fishburne, John Glover, Anthony Hopkins, Liam Neeson, Joe Mantegna, Lou Diamond Phillips, Brad Pitt, Beata Pozniak, Mimi Rogers, Michael Rooker, Theresa Russell, James Spader, Lily Tomlin, Mario Van Peebles, and JoBeth Williams

=== Films with multiple nominations and awards ===
==== Films that received multiple nominations ====
Nominations	Film
6	Hangin' with the Homeboys
6	My Own Private Idaho
5	Rambling Rose
4	Pastime
3	Homicide
3	The Rapture
3	Straight Out of Brooklyn
2	Bright Angel
2	City of Hope
2	Impromptu
2	Kafka
2	Poison
2	Slacker

==== Films that won multiple awards ====
Awards	Film
3	My Own Private Idaho
3	Rambling Rose
