= Mikey Waters =

Michael Waters
- My Own Private Idaho character
- River Phoenix as Mike Waters in My Own Private Idaho
- First appearance: My Own Private Idaho; 1991
- Last appearance: My Own Private River; 2011
- Created by: Gus Van Sant
- Portrayed by: River Phoenix; Joshua Halladay (baby)

In-universe information
- Full name: Michael Waters
- Nicknames: Mike; Mikey
- Occupation: Male prostitute
- Relatives: Sharon Waters (mother); Richard Waters (father; older brother)
- Nationality: American
- Residence: Portland, Oregon, U.S.

Michael Waters is a fictional character in Gus Van Sant's My Own Private Idaho, portrayed by River Phoenix.

He is a sensitive, homeless teenage hustler with narcolepsy, directly foiling his best friend, Scott Favor (Keanu Reeves), a type-A personality hustler from a rich, influential family. A vagabond searching for his mother, Mike proclaims himself a "connoisseur of roads" because he has been "tasting roads all [his] life."

Mikey remains one of the defining characters of New Queer Cinema and, due to the impressive critical reception, is a crucial role in River Phoenix's success and influence as an actor. For example, Eric Alan Edwards, one of the film's directors of photography, said that Phoenix – who died 2 years after the film was released – "really wore the role" because "he looked like a street kid."

== Immediate critical interpretation ==
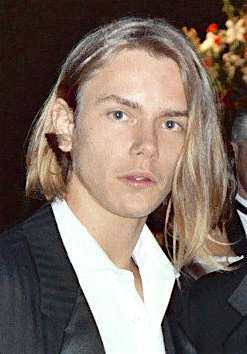
River Phoenix's critically acclaimed performance as gay hustler Mikey Waters helped bring queer cinema to a broader audience.

Roger Ebert characterizes Mikey as someone who "wants...love and by love what he really means is someone to hold him and care for him. He was deeply damaged as a child, and now he seeks shelter; it is a matter of indifference whether he finds it with a man or a woman." The New York Times called Mikey "good-looking, none-too-bright...hapless...hustler" is "the product of a dramatically dysfunctional family" and who, due to his narcolepsy, is often "overwhelmed by sleep." The Washington Post praised Phoenix's approach to Mikey's character, claiming that he "brings an extraordinary quality of comic pathos to his character... he slouches through the movie, a walking blur, seemingly only half awake, but fully engaged." David Ansen of Newsweek praised Phoenix's performance, saying that "Phoenix immerses himself so deeply inside his character you almost forget you've seen him before: it's a stunningly sensitive performance, poignant and comic at once."

== Scholarly interpretation ==
Mark Adnum calls Mikey "a one-man gay Hall of Fame...hustler outlaw, a cigarette constantly in mouth, living on cola and amphetamines" who is "even dressed as a Dutch sailor at one point, replete with Querelle’s pom-pom hat" and also "keeps an elastic umbilical cord to his Midwestern home which he occasionally visits but can no longer relate to."

In "New Queer White Cinema," Daniel Mudie Cunningham claims that Mike exists on the margins of society, outside conventional employment, and beyond the social institutions of marriage and family." Mike, Cunningham writes, is "queer white trash" while Scott Favor, is "gay for cash." In this way, Mike is an unlikely character to be the protagonist of the film—he is queer, homeless, relatively passive, and disabled. Thus, "My Own Private Idaho" presented a new, complex type of hero.

The film is characterized by Mikey's "internal actions." Throughout the film, the audience is "presented with brief clips which indicate his thoughts and feelings." The timeless quality of the film—a mixture of flashbacks, flash-forwards, and the present—is due to Mike's narcolepsy and subsequent memory loss as well as the persistent yearning he has for his childhood.

== Reception ==
River Phoenix was awarded the Volpi Cup for Best Actor at the 1991 Venice Film Festival for his role as Michael. The actor said, in regards to the award: "I don't want more awards. Venice is the most progressive festival. Anything else would be a token." In addition, 21-year-old River became the Best Actor runner-up from the 1991 New York Film Critics Circle and won Independent Spirit Award for Best Male Lead and National Society of Film Critics Award for Best Actor, becoming the second-youngest winner of the former.
