= William Douglas Street Jr. =

American con artist

William Douglas Street Jr. (1951-2020) was an American con artist and impersonator. His life was the basis of Wendell Harris' highly fictionalized 1989 film Chameleon Street, winner of the Grand Jury Prize at the 1990 Sundance Film Festival.

Doug Street, the oldest of five children, graduated Central High School (Detroit) in 1969. He did not do well in high school, and was rejected when he attempted to join the United States Navy afterwards. He later falsely claimed to have served in the Vietnam War, and to have been a graduate of the United States Naval Academy. Instead, he went to Ferris State University where, one day, he stole a motorcycle and went for a joyride. Street wrote the motorcycle’s owner a letter, promising him $1,000 if he did not report the theft to police. Street was arrested and eventually convicted of larceny. He was then kicked out of school. Street’s career options then became very limited.

In 1969, Street arrived, uninvited, at the Boston Red Sox’s spring training site and falsely claimed he had been invited to try out. He was quickly told to leave. Later that summer, he posed as a Time (magazine) reporter in Boston, asking to work out with the team to get a better feel for a (nonexistent) story. Again, he was eventually found out and sent home. Street also tried to order a World Series ring under Bill Crowley’s name, but they caught him when they discovered it was ordered to a Detroit address.

In 1971, Street called executives for the Detroit Tigers and convinced them he was football player Jerry Levias of the Houston Oilers, asking to try out for the Detroit Tigers. Believing his story, the Tigers wrote a press release and had Street pose for photos for the newspaper. “It was a mistake to play those two years in Houston,” Street (as Levias) said, “The players there don’t give it all they got. It’s tough to play when you’ve got a quarterback who won’t throw the ball to you because he’s jealous of all the attention you’ve received.” These comments, which were reported in several newspapers by United Press International, significantly harmed Levias's reputation around Houston, and he was quickly traded to the San Diego Chargers. He later said he lost his passion for football (and most things), and "shut down his emotions" for decades.

Street, while pretending to be Levias, was told he would need a letter from the Oilers saying it was okay for him to try out for the Tigers. When he arrived, he explained his not having this letter by claiming the airline had lost he and another player's luggage, which was convincing enough of a lie for the team to let him try out. But, once he started (as one of the players recalled): “his throws sailed high and wide. He didn’t seem to know the proper way to grip a ball... He ran sprints in front of photographers and quickly became winded. I knew something was wrong. I saw LeVias play in Texas, and he was left-handed. This guy was throwing right-handed.”

The Tigers, having discovered Street was faking, sent him back to Detroit. Once there, because Street knew Tigers player Willie Horton was with the team in Florida, he went to Horton’s home to threaten his wife for money. Fortunately for her, she recognized Street from press coverage of the LeVias incident, refused to open the door and requested he leave a note. The note Street left said he would kill her and her children if she didn't give him $20,000. Mrs. Horton contacted police and Street was sentenced to five years probation.

The following spring, Street enrolled at University of Michigan, but, in 1973, he violated parole by leaving the state and showing up to a University of Michigan football game in Miami, claiming to be a member of the team, ready to play. He was sentenced to prison for his parole violation, and served at least a year-long sentence.

In 1975, he posed as a University of Michigan medical school graduate to obtain a job at Advocate Illinois Masonic Medical Center. He worked there for 3 months, but as one hospital official explained, as a first-year resident, Street "had very little contact with patients" (despite his unverified claims to the contrary) before being caught as a fraud, and arrested by the FBI. He then served another prison term.

In 1979, he volunteered at the Detroit Human rights commission where he claimed to be a law student at University of Michigan. After 3 months of doing "brilliant" work, he was arrested again. Staff found him skillful enough that "if he ever straightens out, we wouldn't mind having him back."

After being released on parole in 1983, he attempted to enter a stock broker training program at Merrill Lynch, but was eventually turned down due to having no sales experience. While there, he met another applicant, who he convinced to start a business with him. Though the business never materialized, Doug used the other man's name to start a credit card and get a bank loan, swindling him out of more than $2000. In the fall of 1983, Doug arrived at the University of Michigan where he pretended to be a law student. He would often wear a naval officer's uniform, and claimed to have graduated from the United States Naval Academy. Over the course of two semesters, he did well in classes, but he also swindled classmates out of over $2000, and the school out of a $800 emergency loan. Before he was arrested, he fled to Yale University, where he posed as a medical student until he was caught and extradited back to Michigan. He was given two prison terms.

In 1985, an article was published in the Ann Arbor News detailing his story. This was the main source material and inspiration for Wendell Harris's Chameleon Street, though Wendell also did extensive interviews with Street while writing his film.

After finishing his prison terms, Street stayed under the radar until 2013, when he bought a $7,000 Rolex using a check which later bounced, and on which he wrote a false home address and phone number. That year, he also bounced a check for $200 to a dry cleaner. A warrant was quickly issued for his arrest, but he was not found until 2015. When he was caught, police discovered he had stolen a doctor's identity and lab coat. For this scam, he had persuaded the doctor's alma maters to send him copies of the doctor's alumni cards, academic transcripts, diplomas, and a class ring. Street traded 70 emails with the class ring sales rep over a nine-month period before finalizing his order. Street also attended multiple alumni events, posing as the doctor, and even spoke at one, in character. At that time, he was also working as a human resources manager at a company under his real name.

In September 2015, he pleaded guilty to identity theft and mail fraud. Without the plea deal, Street would have faced up to 20 years in jail. In February 2016 Street was sentenced to three years in federal prison for identity theft and mail fraud. Over the preceding 46 years he had "racked up 17 criminal convictions and six arrests.

Street dressed as a woman for some of the false identities he assumed, prompting Magistrate Judge Elizabeth Stafford to comment "He has proved himself to be extraordinarily resourceful in perpetuating his schemes," before denying bail.

On Nov. 26, 2019, Street was placed on supervised release from prison. With no resources or help from family, he was left homeless. He was put in the medical center of the Federal Bureau of Prisons, where he battled bone cancer, a fractured left femur, respiratory failure, sepsis and kidney problems. On March 31, 2020, Street died .
