= National Society of Film Critics Award for Best Actor =

Cinematographic award

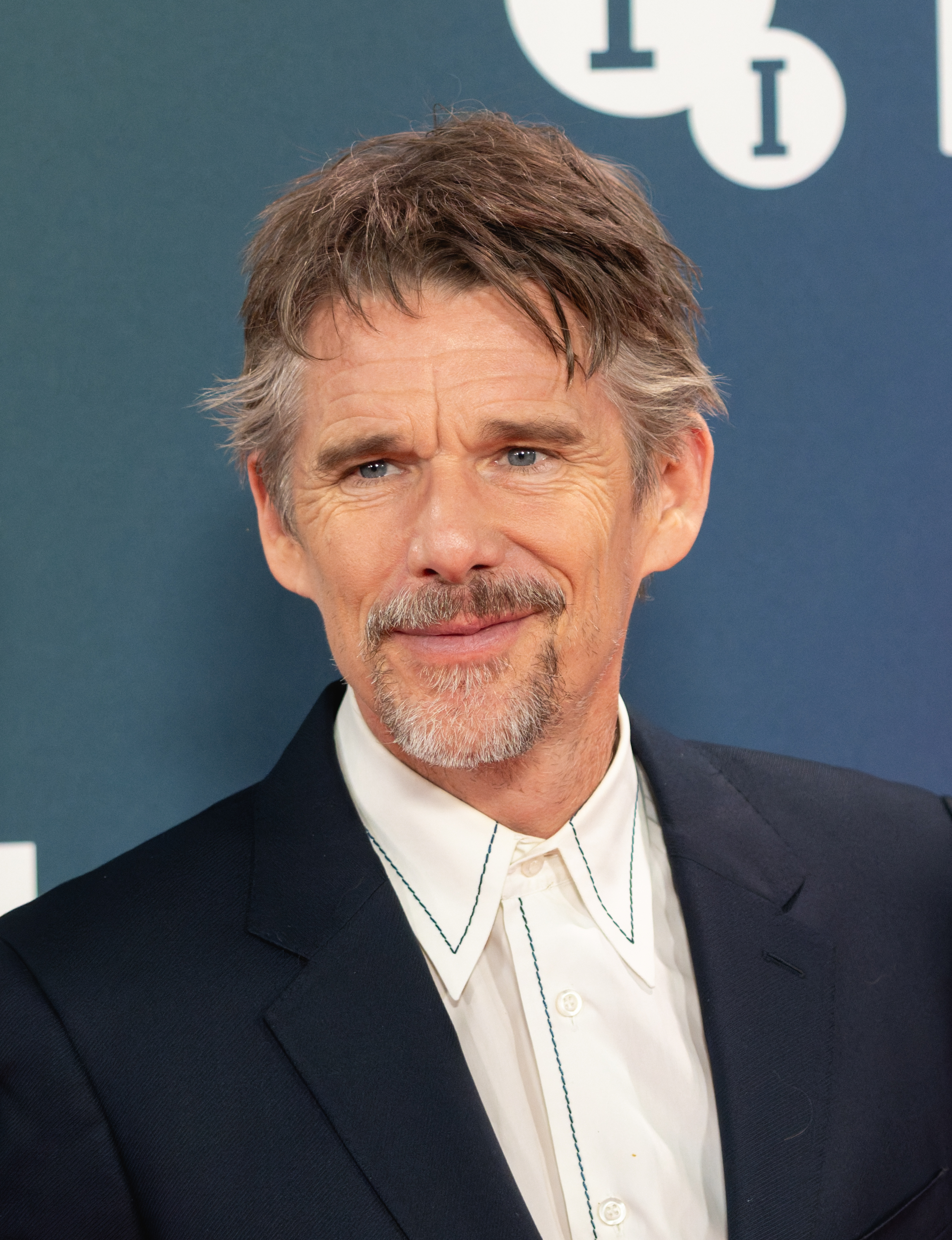
- Current recipient: Ethan Hawke
- Awarded for: Best Performance by an Actor in a Leading Role
- Country: United States
- Presented by: National Society of Film Critics
- First award: Michael Caine; Alfie (1966)
- Currently held by: Ethan Hawke; Blue Moon (2025)
- Website: nationalsocietyoffilmcritics.com

The National Society of Film Critics Award for Best Actor is an annual award given by the National Society of Film Critics to honor the best leading actor of the year.

== Winners ==
=== 1960s ===
Year	Winner	Film	Role
1966	Michael Caine	Alfie	Alfred "Alfie" Elkins
1967	Rod Steiger	In the Heat of the Night	Police Chief Bill Gillespie
1968	Per Oscarsson	Hunger	Pontus
1969	Jon Voight	Midnight Cowboy	Joe Buck

=== 1970s ===
Year	Winner(s)	Film	Role
1970	George C. Scott	Patton	George S. Patton
1971	Peter Finch	Sunday Bloody Sunday	Daniel Hirsh
1972	Al Pacino	The Godfather	Michael Corleone
1973	Marlon Brando	Last Tango in Paris	Paul
1974	Jack Nicholson	Chinatown	J.J. "Jake" Gittes
1974	Jack Nicholson	The Last Detail	Signalman 1st Class Billy "Badass" Buddusky
1975	Jack Nicholson	One Flew Over the Cuckoo's Nest	Randle McMurphy
1976	Robert De Niro	Taxi Driver	Travis Bickle
1977	Art Carney	The Late Show	Ira Wells
1978	Gary Busey	The Buddy Holly Story	Buddy Holly
1979	Dustin Hoffman	Agatha	Wally Stanton
1979	Dustin Hoffman	Kramer vs. Kramer	Ted Kramer

=== 1980s ===
Year	Winner(s)	Film	Role
1980	Peter O'Toole	The Stunt Man	Eli Cross
1981	Burt Lancaster	Atlantic City	Lou Pascal
1982	Dustin Hoffman	Tootsie	Michael Dorsey / Dorothy Michaels
1983	Gérard Depardieu	Danton	Georges Danton
1983	Gérard Depardieu	The Return of Martin Guerre	Arnaud de Tihl
1984	Steve Martin	All of Me	Roger Cobb
1985	Jack Nicholson	Prizzi's Honor	Charley Partanna
1986	Bob Hoskins	Mona Lisa	George
1987	Steve Martin	Roxanne	Charlie "C.D." Bales
1988	Michael Keaton	Beetlejuice	Beetlejuice
1988	Michael Keaton	Clean and Sober	Daryl Poynter
1989	Daniel Day-Lewis	My Left Foot	Christy Brown

=== 1990s ===
Year	Winner(s)	Film	Role
1990	Jeremy Irons	Reversal of Fortune	Claus von Bülow
1991	River Phoenix	My Own Private Idaho	Mikey Waters
1992	Stephen Rea	The Crying Game	Fergus
1993	David Thewlis	Naked	Johnny
1994	Paul Newman	Nobody's Fool	Donald "Sully" Sullivan
1995	Nicolas Cage	Leaving Las Vegas	Ben Sanderson
1996	Eddie Murphy	The Nutty Professor	Sherman Klump / Buddy Love
1997	Robert Duvall	The Apostle	Euliss "Sonny" Dewey / The Apostle E.F.
1998	Nick Nolte	Affliction	Wade Whitehouse
1999	Russell Crowe	The Insider	Jeffrey Wigand

=== 2000s ===
Year	Winner(s)	Film	Role
2000	Javier Bardem	Before Night Falls	Reinaldo Arenas
2001	Gene Hackman	The Royal Tenenbaums	Royal Tenenbaum
2002	Adrien Brody	The Pianist	Władysław Szpilman
2003	Bill Murray	Lost in Translation	Bob Harris
2004	Jamie Foxx	Collateral	Max Durocher
2004	Jamie Foxx	Ray	Ray Charles
2005	Philip Seymour Hoffman	Capote	Truman Capote
2006	Forest Whitaker	The Last King of Scotland	Idi Amin
2007	Daniel Day-Lewis	There Will Be Blood	Daniel Plainview
2008	Sean Penn	Milk	Harvey Milk
2009	Jeremy Renner	The Hurt Locker	Sergeant First Class William James

=== 2010s ===
Year	Winner(s)	Film	Role
2010	Jesse Eisenberg	The Social Network	Mark Zuckerberg
2011	Brad Pitt	Moneyball	Billy Beane
2011	Brad Pitt	The Tree of Life	Mr. O'Brien
2012	Daniel Day-Lewis	Lincoln	Abraham Lincoln
2013	Oscar Isaac	Inside Llewyn Davis	Llewyn Davis
2014	Timothy Spall	Mr. Turner	J. M. W. Turner
2015	Michael B. Jordan	Creed	Adonis Creed
2016	Casey Affleck	Manchester by the Sea	Lee Chandler
2017	Daniel Kaluuya	Get Out	Chris Washington
2018	Ethan Hawke	First Reformed	Pastor Ernst Toller
2019	Antonio Banderas	Pain and Glory	Salvador Mallo

=== 2020s ===
Year	Winner(s)	Film	Role
2020	Delroy Lindo	Da 5 Bloods	Paul
2021	Hidetoshi Nishijima	Drive My Car	Yusuke Kafuku
2022	Colin Farrell	After Yang	Jake
2022	Colin Farrell	The Banshees of Inisherin	Pádraic Súilleabháin
2023	Andrew Scott	All of Us Strangers	Adam
2024	Colman Domingo	Sing Sing	John "Divine G" Whitfield
2025	Ethan Hawke	Blue Moon	Lorenz Hart

== Multiple winners ==
3 wins

- Daniel Day-Lewis (1989, 2007, 2012)
- Jack Nicholson (1974, 1975, 1985)

2 wins

- Ethan Hawke (2018, 2025)
- Dustin Hoffman (1979, 1982)
- Steve Martin (1984, 1987)

== See also ==
- National Board of Review Award for Best Actor
- New York Film Critics Circle Award for Best Actor
- Los Angeles Film Critics Association Award for Best Actor
