= Pastime (film) =

1990 film by Robin B. Armstrong

- Canadian video poster
- Directed by: Robin B. Armstrong
- Written by: David Eyre Jr.
- Produced by: Robin B. Armstrong; Eric Tynan Young
- Starring: William Russ; Glenn Plummer; Noble Willingham; Jeffrey Tambor; Scott Plank
- Cinematography: Tom Richmond
- Edited by: Mark S. Westmore
- Music by: Lee Holdridge
- Production companies: Bullpen; Open Road Productions
- Distributed by: Miramax Films
- Release dates: November 8, 1990 (BFI London Film Festival); August 23, 1991 (United States)
- Running time: 94 minutes
- Country: United States
- Language: English
- Box office: $267,265

Pastime (known as King of the Hill in the United Kingdom) is a 1990 American sports drama film directed by Robin B. Armstrong and written by David Eyre Jr. The film stars William Russ, Glenn Plummer, Noble Willingham, Jeffrey Tambor, and Scott Plank. The film premiered on November 8, 1990 at the London Film Festival and screened at the 1991 Sundance Film Festival under the title One Cup of Coffee, where it won the Audience Award for U.S. Dramatic Film. The film was acquired by Miramax Films and was theatrically released as Pastime on August 23, 1991.

== Plot ==
In 1957, a California low-level minor-league baseball team called the Steamers has a pitcher way beyond his prime, 41-year-old Roy Dean Bream, who reminisces about his brief "cup of coffee" in the Major Leagues and how the great Stan Musial once hit a grand slam home run against him.

New to the team is 17-year-old Tyron Debray, a fireballing pitcher Bream immediately takes under his wing. Because one is old, talkative and white and the other young, quiet and black, various tensions materialize on the team, many of them instigated by Randy Keever, a bad-tempered bully who is another of the team's pitchers.

Bream is keeping a secret as he goes through what is likely to be his final season, a heart condition for which he is taking medication. His dream is to see young Debray succeed and to get one last chance himself before giving up America's "national pastime," baseball, once and for all.

== Cast ==
- William Russ as Roy Dean Bream
- Glenn Plummer as Tyrone Debray
- Noble Willingham as Clyde Bigby
- Jeffrey Tambor as Peter LaPorte
- Scott Plank as Randy Keever
- John Achorn as Cal
- Susan Cash as Mrs. Laporte
- Troy Evans as Art
- Mary Pat Gleason as Woman at Bar
- Ricky Paull Goldin as Hahn
- Kathryn Kates as Ethel
- Peter Murnik as Simmons
- Patrick O'Bryan as Walsh
- Deirdre O'Connell as Inez Brice
- Craig Stark as Bomber Catcher
- Charles Stransky as Elton
- Charles Tyner as Arnold

MLB players Ernie Banks, Don Newcombe, Duke Snider, Harmon Killebrew, Bob Feller, and Bill Mazeroski have cameos in the film.

== Reception ==
On review aggregator website Rotten Tomatoes, the film has a 50% approval rating based on 10 reviews, with an average ranking of 5.7/10.

The film was met with mixed reviews from critics. Owen Gleiberman of Entertainment Weekly gave the film a score of "C+", saying "The movie turns out to be the opposite of Bull Durham: Instead of undermining baseball clichés, it re-embraces them." Marjorie Baumgarten of The Austin Chronicle gave the film 1 star out of 5, but praised the acting.

In contrast, Michael Wilmington of the Los Angeles Times wrote "Some audiences may dismiss "Pastime" as another "male weepie." They shouldn't. It's touching, well-acted, well-written and directed, done with obvious devotion." Harry Haun of the New York Daily News gave the film three stars out of four stars, describing the film as "a worthy postscript to the surprisingly long line of sentimental baseball movies."

== Accolades ==
Under the title One Cup of Coffee, the film won the Audience Award in the Dramatic category at the 1991 Sundance Film Festival. At the 1992 Independent Spirit Awards, the film received nominations for Best Male Lead (William Russ), Best Supporting Female (Deirdre O'Connell), Best Supporting Male (Glenn Plummer), and Best Cinematography (Tom Richmond).

== See also ==
- List of baseball films
