= Rodney Harvey =

American actor (1967–1998)

- Born: Rodney Michael Harvey; July 31, 1967; Philadelphia, Pennsylvania, U.S.
- Died: April 11, 1998 (aged 30); Los Angeles, California, U.S.
- Resting place: Saints Peter and Paul Cemetery
- Occupations: Actor; singer; dancer; model
- Years active: 1985–1996

Rodney Michael Harvey (July 31, 1967 – April 11, 1998) was an American actor, model, singer and dancer.

== Career ==
Born in Philadelphia, Pennsylvania, to Eddie and Lois Harvey. Harvey was "discovered" by director Paul Morrissey in 1984. Morrissey cast Harvey in two of his films Mixed Blood (1984) and Spike of Bensonhurst (1988). Harvey attended South Philadelphia High School through the 11th grade, but dropped out to pursue a movie career. After signing with an agent, Harvey moved to Los Angeles where he continued acting and also began modelling. He appeared in a layout for Life magazine featuring Madonna photographed by Bruce Webber and worked for Calvin Klein.

In 1990, he landed the role of Sodapop Curtis in the Fox series The Outsiders. After the series ended after one season, Harvey guest starred on Twin Peaks, followed by a role in the Gus Van Sant film My Own Private Idaho. Harvey also appeared in the 1988 film Salsa alongside Draco Rosa. He made his last onscreen appearance in 1996 with a role in the drama God's Lonely Man.

== Death ==
During the making of My Own Private Idaho, Harvey began using heroin. After several stints in jail and attempts to get clean, he died of a heroin and cocaine overdose on April 11, 1998, at the Hotel Barbizon in Los Angeles.

Following his death, photos of Harvey in the depths of heroin addiction appeared in an Office of Drug Control Policy (Partnership for a Drug-Free America) public service announcement.

== Filmography ==
Year	Title	Role	Notes
1984	Mixed Blood	Jose	Alternative title: Cocaïne
1985	Delivery Boys	Fast Action	
1986	The Return of Billy Jack		Unfinished film
1987	Initiation	Danny Molloy	Alternative title: Zoomstone
1987	Beauty Brothers	Rodney	Short film directed by Bruce Weber
1987	Five Corners	Castro	
1988	Salsa	Ken	
1988	Spike of Bensonhurst	Frankie	Alternative titles: The Mafia Kid; Throw Back!
1988	Let's Get Lost	Self	Documentary directed by Bruce Weber
1990	Silent Love	Giulio	Alternative title: La bocca
1990	Twin Peaks	Biker Scotty	Episode: Pilot
1990	The Outsiders	Sodapop Curtis	13 episodes
1991	My Own Private Idaho	Gary	
1992	Guncrazy	Tom	
1996	God's Lonely Man	Glen	
1999	E! True Hollywood Story	Self	Episode: "Poisoned Dreams: Rodney Harvey" (Archive footage)
2012	My Own Private River	Gary	Archive footage
2021	Kid 90	Self	Documentary (Archive footage)

=== Music videos and commercials ===
Year	Title	Role	Notes
1985	"Hold Me"	Self	Music video by Menudo
1990	Obsession	Self	Calvin Klein advertisement directed by David Lynch
1998	"Rodney... on Heroin"	Self	Anti-drug public service announcement (posthumous)
