= My Own Private River =

2011 American drama film

- Promotional screening poster
- Directed by: Gus Van Sant; James Franco
- Written by: Gus Van Sant
- Starring: River Phoenix; Keanu Reeves
- Edited by: James Franco
- Music by: James Franco
- Release date: September 25, 2011
- Running time: 101 minutes
- Country: United States
- Language: English

My Own Private River is a re-contextualized adventure drama film of My Own Private Idaho (1991). Using footage shot and directed by Gus Van Sant in 1990, the new edit gives James Franco and Van Sant a shared director credit. The project is in tribute to Franco's favorite actor, River Phoenix. Franco called My Own Private Idaho one of his favorite movies and praised River's performance as the actor's best.

My Own Private River had its premieres at the Hollywood Theatre on September 25, 2011, at the Walter Reade Theater on February 19, 2012, and at the Film Society of Lincoln Center on February 24, 2012.

== Cast ==
- River Phoenix as Michael "Mikey" Waters
- Keanu Reeves as Scott Favor
- James Russo as Richard Waters
- Vana O'Brien as Sharon Waters
- Rodney Harvey as Gary
- William Richert as Bob Pigeon
- Grace Zabriskie as Alena
- Chiara Caselli as Carmela
- Udo Kier as Hans
- Flea as Budd

== Development and release ==
In 2007, at a conference meeting in New York City for the 2008 film Milk, Franco and Van Sant responded to questions about Franco's favourite movie, which turned out to be My Own Private Idaho. Van Sant admired Franco's appreciation for the film, while Van Sant enticed Franco to give him a tour of the film's locations in Portland, Oregon. Franco expressed his wish to Van Sant to access the outtake footage for the original film.

Van Sant showed Franco the collection of unseen film. Franco was interested to digitize and assemble the footage as a re-contextualized film. About the unseen footage, Franco stated, “I edited the film as I imagined Gus might have if he made My Own Private Idaho today,”

In an interview in February, 2012, Franco suggested that the film was unlikely to be released on DVD or Blu-ray, joking that "New Line doesn't want us to compete with the original either."

== Music ==
Songs that play during the film include:

1. R.E.M – "Alligator Aviator Autopilot Antimatter"
2. R.E.M – "Überlin"
3. R.E.M – "Blue"
