= Joseph Vásquez =

American film director

Joseph Vasquez
- Born: Joseph B. Vasquez; June 8, 1962; New York City, U.S.
- Died: December 3, 1995 (aged 33); Chula Vista, California, U.S.
- Occupations: Writer, Director, Actor

Joseph B. "Joe" Vasquez (June 8, 1962 – December 16, 1995) was an American independent filmmaker.

== Early life ==
Vasquez was born in the South Bronx on June 8, 1962 to his parents, Dolores and Fermin Vasquez. His father was Puerto Rican and his mother was African-American. due to his parents being heroin addicts, Vasquez and his older brothers Tito and Tony were given to Bertha Vasquez, their paternal grandmother, He began making his own films at the age of 12 with a super 8 millimeter camera, often recruiting friends from the neighborhood to play the roles, and he would later show them at his Grandmother’s apartment. He would shoot about 30 or 40 films

In 1983, he got accepted into the film department at City College of New York, later earning a filmmaking degree.

== Career ==
After completing his studies, Vasquez embarked upon his first feature film in 16 mm, made on a budget for $30,000, Street Story (later known as Street Hitz in a home video release), Vasquez wrote, directed, edited, produced the film, and even managed to get the film distributed.

In 1989, he released his second film The Bronx War, which he wrote, directed, and starred in, being shown at a few film festivals, the film was not entirely successful, but it did catch the attention of several film studios, New Line Cinema became interested in Vasquez and wanted to distribute his next project.

Going three days without sleep, he quickly produced a script that had been in his head for years, a semi autobiographical coming-of-age tale of one night in the life of four friends in the south Bronx, the resulting film was Hangin' with the Homeboys a buddy comedy in the tradition of American Graffiti and Diner, the film earned him critical acclaim.

In 1994, he got an offer to make a film in Puerto Rico, "Rice, Beans and Ketchup, later retitled "Manhattan Merenge!" was Vasquez’s attempt to cross the dance musical genre with an immigrant love story, while sold to home video markets in Europe, the film was never released theatrically in the United States, appearing only at film festivals. Having been arrested for running naked through an apartment building, he was later diagnosed as manic-depressive.

In March 1995, Vasquez attempted to direct a horror film he had written, despite raising money, and shooting a few days worth of film, the project soon shut down after the crew deserted the set.

== Death ==
On December 16, 1995, Vasquez died as a result of AIDS-related complications in Chula Vista, California, aged 33.

After his death, one of his stories "Caught in the Fever" was posthumously used as a segment in the 1997 television film Riot. Another unproduced script was made as the 2013 film "The House that Jack Built".

== Filmography ==
=== Film ===
Year	Title	Writer	Producer	Director
1989	The Bronx War	Yes	No	Yes
1991	Hangin' with the Homeboys	Yes	No	Yes
1992	Street Hitz	Yes	Yes	Yes
1995	Manhattan Merengue!	Yes	No	Yes
1997	Riot	Yes	No	No
2013	The House That Jack Built	Yes	No	No

=== Unmade projects ===
- Hangin' with the Homegirls, A follow up to Homeboys which would’ve taken place on the same night, but would’ve focused on several young women in the Bronx.
- Writing on the Wall, a script by Seth Zvi Rosenfeld based on his own play about three racially mixed teens who must confront their own prejudices because of a homicide.
- Hell's Kitchen Kids, a screenplay Vasquez was writing for TriStar Pictures
- Clover, an adaptation of the Dori Sanders novel of the same name
- Chameleon Street, A remake of the 1989 film of the same name

==== Acting credits ====
Year	Film	Role	Notes
1982	Losing Ground	Student Cameraman	
1989	The Bronx War	Tito Sunshine	
1990	On The Block	Joey	
