= Hangin' with the Homeboys =

1991 film by Joseph Vásquez

- VHS cover
- Directed by: Joseph Vasquez
- Written by: Joseph Vasquez
- Produced by: Richard Brick
- Starring: Doug E. Doug; Mario Joyner; John Leguizamo; Nestor Serrano
- Cinematography: Anghel Decca
- Edited by: Michael Schweitzer
- Music by: Mick Mars
- Production companies: Juno Pix; New Line Cinema
- Distributed by: New Line Cinema
- Release date: January 1991 (Sundance): April 5, 1991 (United States)
- Running time: 90 minutes
- Country: United States
- Language: English
- Budget: <$2 million
- Box office: $532,993

Hangin' with the Homeboys is a 1991 American coming-of-age comedy-drama film directed by Joseph Vasquez. It premiered at the Sundance Film Festival in 1991, where it won the Waldo Salt Screenwriting Award. It was released by New Line Cinema on April 5, 1991.

== Plot ==
Tom, Willie, Johnny, and Vinny are four friends who grew up together in the Bronx. Tom aspires to be an actor and sells magazine subscriptions over the phone to pay the rent. Johnny, the youngest of the group, works in a supermarket; though he's been encouraged to go to college, he's afraid to take the first step—filling out an application for a scholarship. Vinny is a smooth-talking ladies' man who hides his Puerto Rican heritage behind the lie that he's Italian. Willie is unemployed and unemployable, convinced that he's oppressed by racial prejudice.

On a Friday night, the friends go out for a "guys' night" in Manhattan and suffer various disasters, (Tom wrecks his car, Willie gets the guys thrown out of a party) most of which they bring on themselves. During their night out, their relationships with one another become strained as the events lead to conflict between them.

== Cast ==
- Mario Joyner plays Tom, an aspiring actor who works as a telemarketer while waiting for his big break (The closest he got to making it was playing a waiter in Rain Man, but his part was cut). His girlfriend cancels their date for the night, so he goes out with his friends, and later finds out she is out with another man. At the end of the movie, he reveals that he is weary of his friends and their destructive and derisive behavior between themselves. He is especially angry at Willie and Vinny, who manipulate him into paying for them because they are unemployed, but constantly criticize and make fun of him.
- Doug E. Doug plays Willie, an angry unemployed bum who embraces the Black Power movement, but is genuinely devoted to his best friend Johnny. He has a tenuous friendship with Vinny and a passing friendship with Tom (which disintegrates when Tom calls him on his mooching). He is hypocritical, calling Tom a failure even though he is comparable to a bum, and describing a black female he encounters towards the end of the film as an Uncle Tom because she "dresses white", but he is not a member of any political organization and does not even vote.
- Nestor Serrano plays Fernando (aka Vinny), a philandering Puerto Rican who is ashamed of his heritage and pretends to be Italian, much to Johnny's horror. He later has to confront this fact when a police officer asks him about his nationality. The oldest of the four, he is cynical and verbally abusive to virtually everyone. He is a sex-hound who tries to talk to every pretty girl he sees. He is both amused at and contemptuous of Johnny's naivete and has a strained interaction with him because he sees him as a sad individual who would depress everybody in the gang, especially him. Vinny is unemployed, but is supported by the generosity of his many girlfriends. Hypocritically, he openly derides Willie's lack of employment.
- John Leguizamo plays Johnny, the youngest of the group, who is idealistic and naive. Also Puerto Rican, Johnny is very proud of his heritage, unlike Vinny. He works at a grocery store, but has an opportunity for a scholarship. Romantically naive and having a rather chivalrous ideal towards love, he is infuriated to find Vinny dancing suggestively with Daria, the girl he has a secret crush on. The last straw comes when Vinny selfishly demands an apology for "ruining his night". Instead, Johnny punches him on the jaw and knocks him unconscious. At the end of the movie, the disastrous night makes him decide to go for the scholarship and start a new chapter in his life, away from his "friends".
- Mary B. Ward as Luna

== Reception ==
Hangin’ with the Homeboys received largely positive reviews from critics. On Rotten Tomatoes, it holds a rating of 93% from 41 reviews.

Jonathan Rosenbaum of the Chicago Reader called it "a beautiful film" and Variety commented the film "is infused with an aggressive and engaging street energy and plenty of humor". Jay Boyar of the Orlando Sentinel said "this semiautobiographical production has an exuberance that recalls such other coming-of-age movies as American Graffiti and Diner". Though Boyar said the film gets "slightly preachy at the end…Director Vasquez treats the people in his movie sympathetically, but with an edge of irony that makes most of what happens humorous." Dave Kehr of the Chicago Tribune wrote the film "transcends its drive-in title to become a compelling Cassavetes-like study of male friendship." Owen Gleiberman of Entertainment Weekly wrote, "the actors fill out their roles, especially Leguizamo, who gives Johnny a furtive, soulful complexity. He lends an emotional credence to the film’s message, which is that you have to help yourself — not because some phony 'go for it' triumph awaits, but because if you don’t no one else will."

=== Accolades ===
The film won the prize for Audience Award at the Deauville American Film Festival. It was also nominated for several awards at the 7th Independent Spirit Awards, including Best Director and Best Screenplay for Vasquez, Best Male Lead for Doug E. Doug, Best Supporting Female for Mary B. Ward, and Best Film Music for David Chackler and Joel Sill.

== Soundtrack ==
1. "The Power (Homeboys Mix)" - Snap
2. "Rock Bottom" - 2 in a Room
3. "Dance All Night (House Mix)" - Poison Clan
4. "Swingin'" - Prince Akeem
5. "Ticket to Heaven" - The Knowledge featuring Kenny Bobien
6. "Do You Believe" - Beat Goes Bang
7. "Pretty Girls" - Stevie B
8. "Games" - Trinere
9. "We Want Some Pussy" - The 2 Live Crew
10. "Vacate the Premises" - The 2awk
11. "What Is Black" - Billy Box
12. "Hangin' With the Homeboys and Dr. Feelgood" - The 2 Live Crew
