= Raleigh Studios =

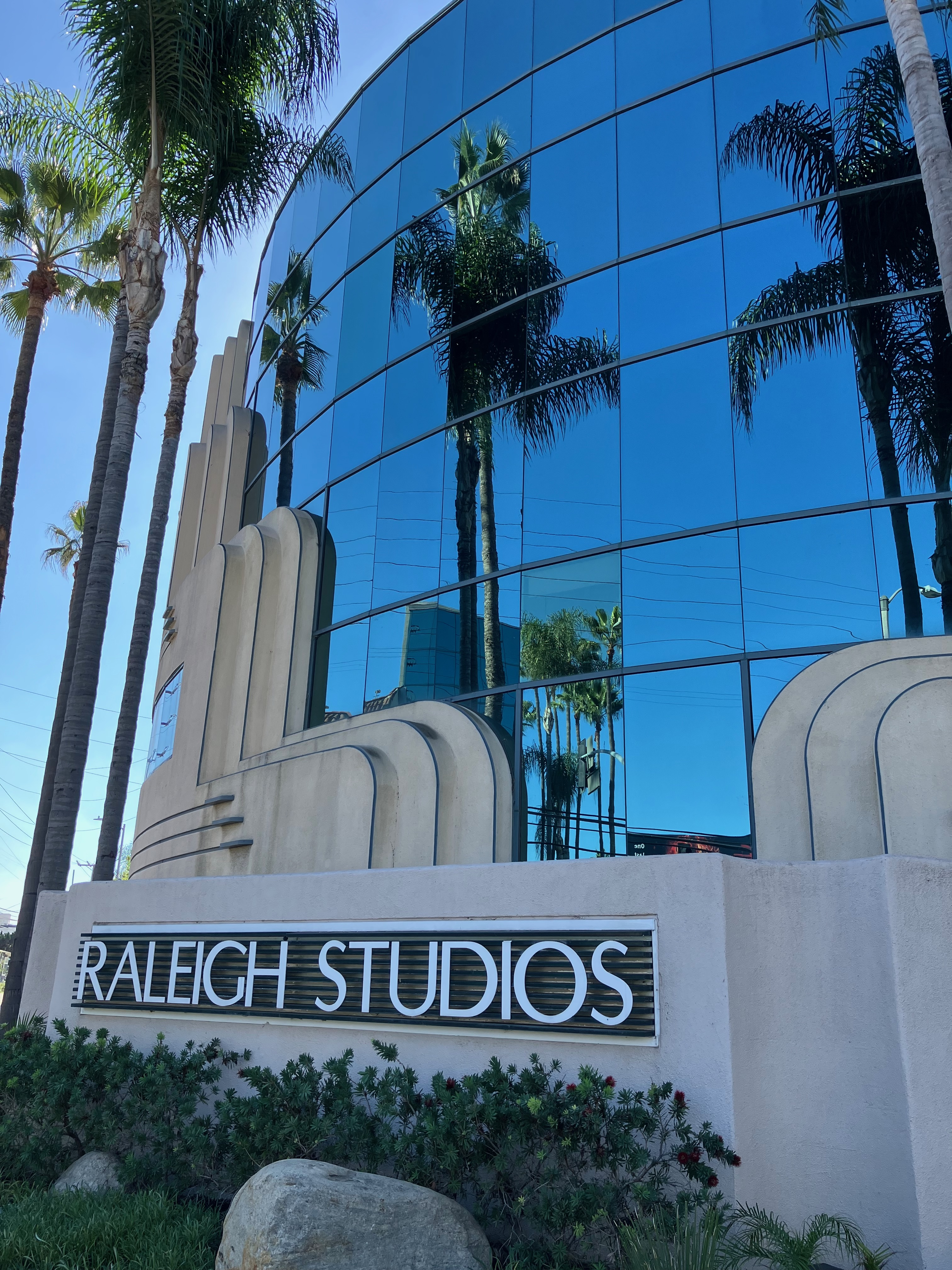
- Raleigh Studios building on Melrose Avenue, November 2025
- Interactive map of the Raleigh Studios area

General information
- Location: 5300 Melrose Avenue; Hollywood, California; 90038
- Opened: 1979 (47 years ago) (as Raleigh Studios)
- Owner: Raleigh Enterprises

Raleigh Studios is a studio facility located in the Hollywood neighborhood of Los Angeles, California, United States, and has been under the ownership of Raleigh Enterprises since 1979. The location has been active since 1915. Before Raleigh, the studio was run by the Famous Players Film Company, Producers Studios, Clune Studios, California Studios, Gross-Krasne Productions, and others. Raleigh "has no identifiable brand or logo", serving as a rental space for numerous films both before Raleigh Enterprises ownership and afterward. Author Tom Ogden describes Raleigh Studios as "an independent studio, unaffiliated with any of the majors" which in 2009 had nine soundstages available. As of 2022, the location had 13 soundstages.

There are offshoots of Raleigh Studios, including Raleigh Studios Michigan in Pontiac, Michigan.
