= Chameleon Street =

1989 American film

- Directed by: Wendell B. Harris Jr.
- Written by: Wendell B. Harris Jr.
- Produced by: Dan Lawton
- Starring: Wendell B. Harris Jr. Timothy Alvaro; Renauld Bailleux
- Cinematography: Dan Noga
- Edited by: Wendell B. Harris, Jr.
- Music by: Peter S. Moore
- Release dates: September 13, 1989 (Toronto Festival of Festivals); April 24, 1990 (New York City)
- Running time: 94 minutes
- Country: United States
- Language: English

Chameleon Street is a 1989 American independent black comedy drama film written, directed by and starring Wendell B. Harris Jr. It tells the story of a social chameleon who impersonates reporters, doctors and lawyers in order to make money.

== Summary ==
The film is a satire based on the life of Detroit con artist and high-school drop-out William Douglas Street Jr., who successfully impersonated professional reporters, lawyers, athletes, extortionists, and surgeons, going so far as to perform more than 36 successful hysterectomies.

== Cast ==
- Wendell B. Harris Jr. as William Douglas Street
- Timothy Alvaro as Brian Whitaker
- Dave Barber as Self
- Marti Bowling as Marti
- Alfred Bruce Bradley as Smooth
- Mano Breckenridge as Neelish Ratnayaka
- Anthony Ennis as Curtis
- Amina Fakir as Amina Tatiana

== Reception and legacy ==
Despite winning the Grand Jury Prize at the Sundance Film Festival in early 1990, the film went without distribution for more than a year. The original theatrical release was minimal and reviews were polarizing.

The Washington Post found the film disappointing: "What we have here is a brilliant concept, but unfortunately, Harris just isn't a filmmaker — not even in the most rudimentary sense. His failures are all on the most basic level. He can't plot or shape scenes; he can't draw out his actors; he can't write dialogue or mount it; he can't create any consistent rhythms or sense of pace." Similarly, the Hartford Courant wrote "Chameleon Street feels like a series of improvised skits, some imaginative and funny, some hackneyed...[Harris] writes with élan and wit, but his sense of structure is minimal, so Chameleon Street feels jumpy and disjointed."

On the other hand, The Philadelphia Inquirer was more generous: "Though, like its subject, the film goes on some pretty strange tangents, Chameleon Street is largely successful as the diary of a compulsive trickster whose marks are suckered by Street's confidence and instinct for telling people what they want to hear. Harris' truth-is-stronger-than-fiction rap is both funny and insightful."

Jonathan Rosenbaum of The Chicago Reader praised it as a "highly original existential dark comedy," writing that "it took two years for this provocative independent feature to reach Chicago, yet it’s as intellectually ambitious as any new American picture I’ve seen this year...Harris explores his subject in a number of ways: as an essay of sorts on the mysteries and paradoxes of acting, as the source of some very funny comedy, as an exploration of the invisibility of blacks in America that often suggests Ralph Ellison’s Invisible Man, and as a disturbing yet compelling rogue’s progress that often calls to mind an 18th-century picaresque novel." Film critic Armond White was also an early supporter of the film, comparing it to Ellison's Invisible Man as well.

In the years since its original release, the film's reputation has grown, with Richard Brody of The New Yorker in 2021 calling it an "overlooked masterpiece" while lamenting Harris's subsequent struggles in Hollywood, observing that "the very exclusions [Harris] dramatized in this great film were inflicted on him in real life."

In 2021, the film was restored in 4K resolution, released theatrically by Arbelos Films. Arbelos later released it on Blu-ray.

== Accolades ==
Chameleon Street won the Grand Jury Prize at the 1990 Sundance Film Festival.

In 2008, a festival press release described it as "one of the first films to examine how mellifluously race, class, and role-playing morph into the social fabric of America."

== See also ==
- Work Experience - 1989 Academy Award for Best Live Action Short Film winner similar in content

Awards
Preceded by True Love	Sundance Grand Jury Prize: U.S. Dramatic; 1990	Succeeded by Poison
