= 1991 New York Film Critics Circle Awards =

57th New York Film Critics Circle Awards

57th New York Film Critics Circle Awards

January 12, 1992

Best Picture:
The Silence of the Lambs

The 57th New York Film Critics Circle Awards, honoring the best filmmaking of 1991, were announced on 17 December 1991 and presented on 12 January 1992.

== Winners ==
- Best Actor:
  - Anthony Hopkins - The Silence of the Lambs
  - Runners-up: River Phoenix - My Own Private Idaho and Nick Nolte - The Prince of Tides
- Best Actress:
  - Jodie Foster - The Silence of the Lambs
  - Runners-up: Geena Davis and Susan Sarandon - Thelma & Louise
- Best Cinematography:
  - Roger Deakins - Barton Fink
  - Runner-up: Freddie Francis - Cape Fear
- Best Director:
  - Jonathan Demme - The Silence of the Lambs
  - Runner-up: Gus Van Sant - My Own Private Idaho
- Best Documentary:
  - Paris Is Burning
  - Runner-up: Hearts of Darkness: A Filmmaker's Apocalypse
- Best Film:
  - The Silence of the Lambs
  - Runner-up: My Own Private Idaho
- Best Foreign Language Film:
  - Europa Europa • Germany/France
  - Runner-up: The Vanishing (Spoorloos) • Netherlands/France
- Best New Director:
  - John Singleton - Boyz n the Hood
  - Runner-up: Anthony Minghella - Truly, Madly, Deeply
- Best Screenplay:
  - David Cronenberg - Naked Lunch
  - Runner-up: Calder Willingham - Rambling Rose
- Best Supporting Actor:
  - Samuel L. Jackson - Jungle Fever
  - Runners-up: Steven Hill - Billy Bathgate and John Goodman - Barton Fink
- Best Supporting Actress:
  - Judy Davis - Naked Lunch and Barton Fink
  - Runners-up: Juliette Lewis - Cape Fear and Kate Nelligan - Frankie and Johnny and The Prince of Tides
