= Dave Barber =

American radio personality

David Raymond Barber (April 25, 1955 – July 4, 2015) was an American talk radio and television personality from Flint, Michigan.

Born to parents of Croatian descent, Barber attended Central Michigan University. In the 1970s, Barber started his radio career at WTRX, where he hosted a talk program called Flint Feedback. Barber's show often dealt with controversial topics, including an incident when he had a naked woman in his studio, long before the days of Howard Stern. Barber also did shows on WTAC (now WSNL) and WFDF. In 2001, Barber moved to the Michigan Talk Radio Network where his show was syndicated to radio stations across the state of Michigan. After short stints for Air America Radio and another Flint station, WWCK (AM), Barber moved to Providence, RI in 2006 and worked for WPRO and then Capital TV.

Barber returned to the Flint area on June 25, 2015 to attend a family wedding. However, while at a rehearsal dinner, Barber choked and collapsed. He was rushed to a Pontiac, MI hospital where doctors discovered that he had a heart attack and a stroke. After 10 days in a coma, Barber died at 10:45 a.m. on July 4 at the age of 60.

Barber was once married to Ann Burke. He had a son, Chase Seegmiller, from a previous relationship. He is also survived by a brother and many relatives.
