= Wendell B. Harris Jr. =

American actor

- Born: Wendell Burks Harris Jr. March 5, 1954 (age 71)
- Occupation(s): Actor, filmmaker

Wendell B. Harris Jr. (born March 5, 1954), is a Juilliard- and Interlochen-trained American filmmaker and actor.

== Career ==
He is known as the writer, director and lead actor of Chameleon Street, which won the Dramatic Grand Jury Prize at the 1990 Sundance Film Festival.

Harris and Prismatic Images went on to produce a radio series entitled Black Biography, which showcased black icons from the spheres of art, history, and politics. He has appeared as an actor in the films Out of Sight (1998) and Road Trip (2000). Harris is currently in post-production for the forthcoming documentary Arbiter Roswell, a 14-year project chronicling the relationship between public opinion, the media, and the military-industrial complex.

== Filmography ==
Year	Title	Role	Notes
1986	Colette Vignette		Director
1989	Chameleon Street	William Douglas Street	Uncredited Also director and writer
1998	Out of Sight	Daniel Burdon	
2000	Road Trip	Professor Anderson	

== Awards and nominations ==
Year	Award	Category	Nominated work	Result
1990	Sundance Film Festival	Dramatic Grand Jury Prize	Chameleon Street	Won
1992	Independent Spirit Awards	Best First Feature	Chameleon Street	Nominated
