= Green SM =

Vietnamese taxi company

GSM Green and Smart Mobility JSC

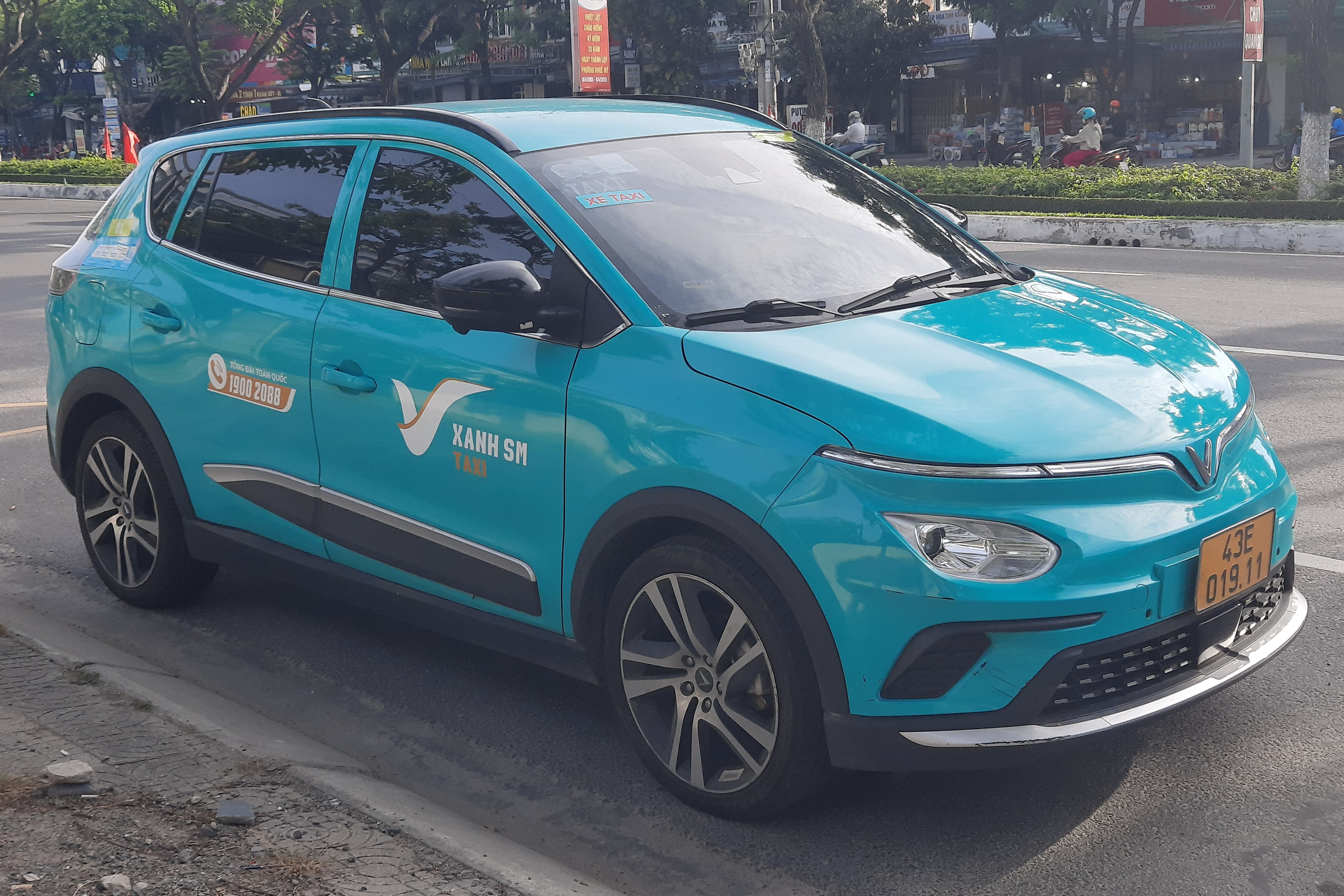
- GSM VF e34 operating in Đà Nẵng
- Trade name: Green and Smart Mobility – GSM
- Native name: CTCP Di chuyển Xanh và Thông minh GSM
- Type: Private
- Industry: Road passenger transport, car rental
- Founder: Phạm Nhật Vượng
- Headquarters: Hanoi
- Area served: Vietnam; Laos; Indonesia; Philippines; India; Kazakhstan; Denmark; Netherlands; United States
- Key people: Nguyễn Văn Thanh (CEO)
- Products: Transport services using VinFast electric vehicles
- Brands: Xanh SM; Green SM; Green GSM
- Services: Car rental, passenger transport
- Subsidiaries: XanhSM Sole Co., Ltd. PT XANHSM Green and Smart Mobility Indonesia; Green and Smart Mobility Philippines Inc. Green SM India Private Ltd. Green and Smart Mobility Technologies Kazakhstan LLP; Green SM Denmark ApS
- Website: https://www.greensm.com/

Green and Smart Mobility JSC (GSM; Vietnamese: CTCP Di chuyển Xanh và Thông minh), operating as as Green SM or redundantly Green GSM (stylized all-uppercase) and formerly Xanh SM (lit. 'Cyan SM' or 'Grue SM', also stylized all-uppercase) in Mainland Southeast Asia, is a taxi and ridesharing company in Vietnam. It operates in two main fields: electric taxis and rental of electric cars and electric motorcycles from VinFast, with an investment scale of 10,000 cars and 100,000 motorcycles. It is the first all-electric taxi company in Vietnam.

GSM was founded by Phạm Nhật Vượng, chairman of the Vingroup, with a charter capital of 3,000 billion VND, of which Phạm Nhật Vượng holds 95% of the shares. GSM is considered as the world's first green transportation rental and multi-platform taxi company. It officially started operations in Hanoi on April 14, 2023.

The primary color of GSM is cyan. The company launched operations in Laos in 2023, being its first market outside of Vietnam. It was followed by Indonesia in late 2024, initially operating as Xanh SM and later renamed to Green SM. It started operations in the Philippines as Green GSM in mid-2025.

GSM is making its first entry into Europe in 2026, starting up with 600 vehicles in Copenhagen, Denmark. The company will officially launch their services in Denmark on the 30th of July 2026.

GSM Entered India on 5th June 2026 at New Delhi which is based on Limo Green.

On September 25, 2026, GSM launched trial operations in the Netherlands, making it the company's second European market after Denmark.

== History ==
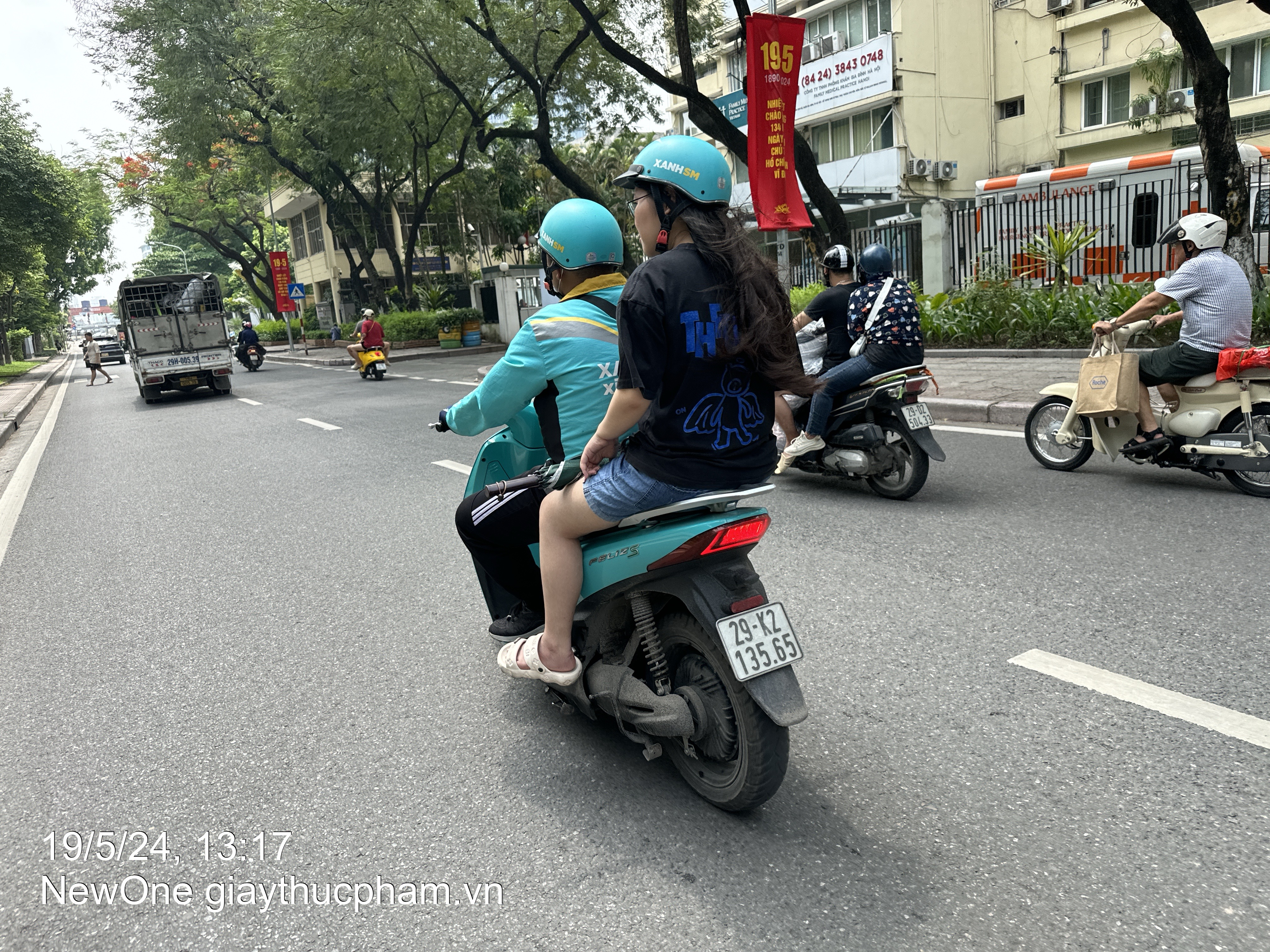
Xanh SM electric motorcycle on the streets of Hanoi

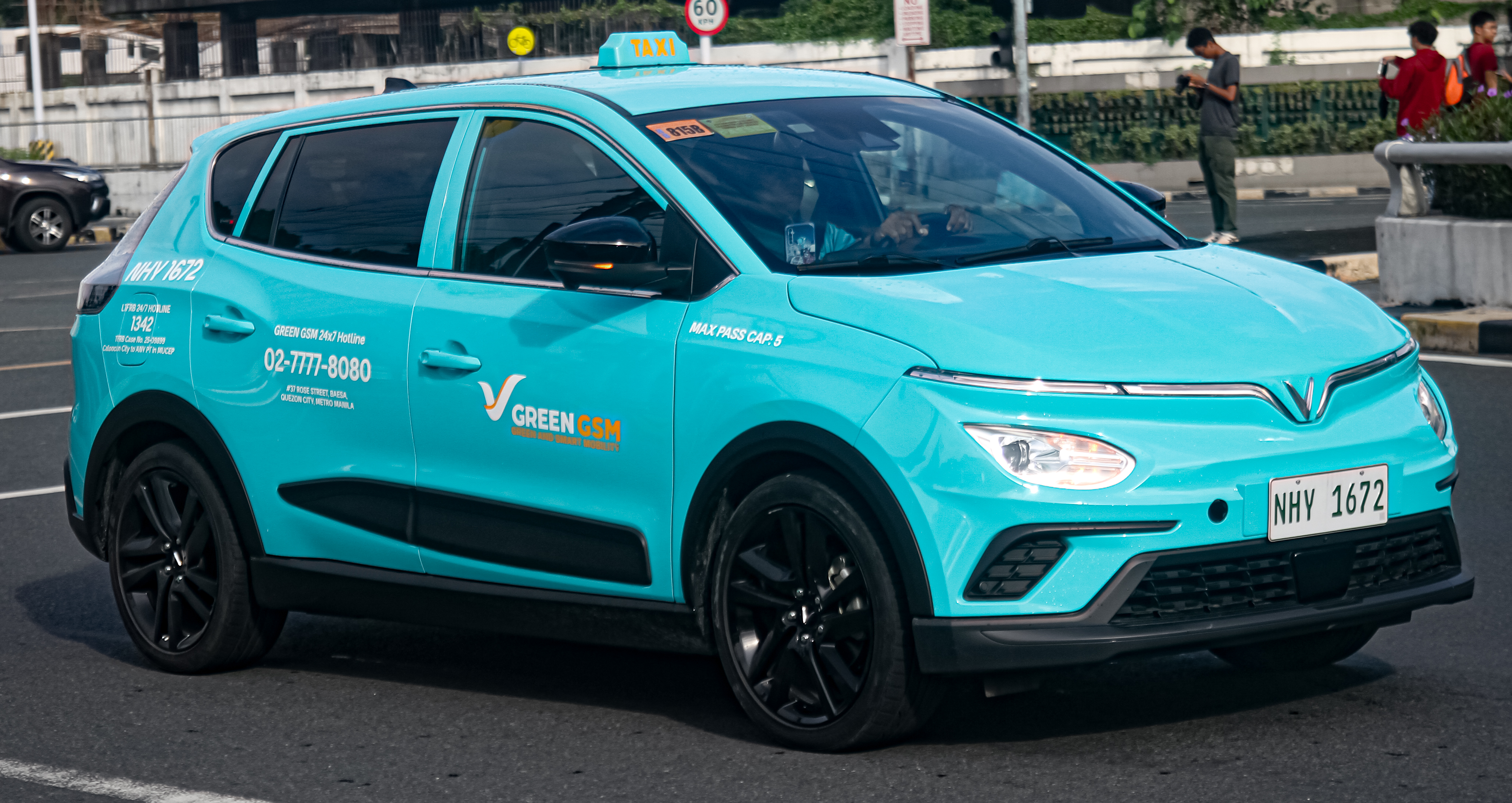
A Green GSM VinFast VF e34/Nerio Green in the Philippines

GSM was founded by Phạm Nhật Vượng with a charter capital of 3 trillion VND, of which Phạm Nhật Vượng holds 95% of the shares. The company officially began operations in Hanoi on April 14, 2023. Nguyễn Văn Thanh was chosen as its global CEO.

Xanh SM Taxi was established in response to Vietnam's national goal on climate change, with efforts to reduce emissions from transportation vehicles.

On April 27, 2023, Xanh SM launched in Ho Chi Minh City. On October 13, Xanh SM deployed 150 VinFast electric cars (VF 5 Plus) to Laos, becoming an international electric ride-hailing company. On November 9, Xanh SM Laos launched in Vientiane.

As of May 2024, Xanh SM has over 30,000 electric taxis, accounting for more than 40% of the total taxis of Vietnam.

In Indonesia, the service was first introduced as Xanh SM in December 2024. However, in April 2025, it was renamed Green SM for easier pronunciation by Indonesians.

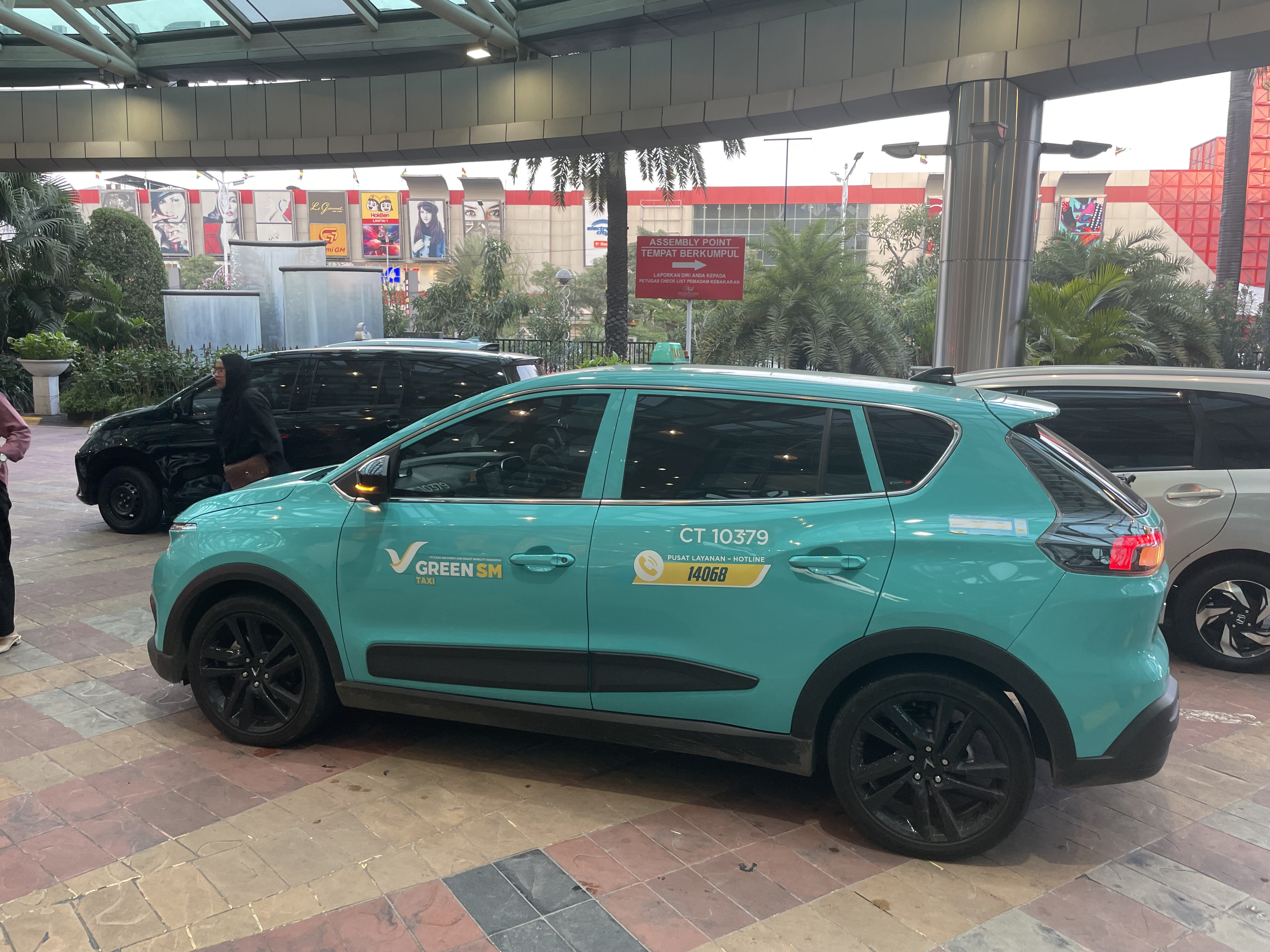
A Green SM taxi in Jakarta, Indonesia

In December 2024, the company announced that VinFast withdrew its VF 8 electric vehicles from the Vietnamese market Green SM taxi service to reinforce the model's premium market positioning in Vietnam. The VF 8 fleet will be transferred to FGF, a company specializing in the sale and rental of VinFast electric cars, to offer rental services to individuals and businesses or for direct sale to interested customers. GSM's taxi services in Vietnam will continue with other VinFast models, including the VF 5 and VF e34.

For the Danish market, Green SM Taxi uses mainly VF 8, supplemented by VF 6.

=== Bekasi train collision ===
On 27 April 2026, a Green SM taxi was involved in a fatal train crash in Bekasi, Indonesia. The incident began at approximately 20:52 WIB when a Green SM taxi stalled on the tracks at an unmarked level crossing on Jalan Ampera, Bulak Kapal, and was struck by an Angke-bound KRL Commuterline train. The high-speed impact caused KAI 4 to crush the rearmost women-only carriage, resulting in 16 fatalities and dozens of injuries.

Following the crash, PT Xanh SM Green and Smart Mobility Indonesia (Green SM Indonesia) issued an official response on 28 April. After widespread criticism for not including condolences or an apology to those affected, Green SM released a second statement later the same day, expressing their condolences but still without an apology.

Several Indonesian media outlets immediately compared Green SM's response with that of PT Kereta Api Indonesia (KAI, the country's main state-owned railway operator), which had included both condolences and an apology in its official statement. Green SM also faced criticism after it closed the comments section on its Instagram posts and made its account on X (formerly Twitter) private, steps that some social media users interpreted as an attempt to avoid public criticism. In response, Indonesian netizens initiated a boycott of the brand. Several anonymous accounts allegedly tied to Green SM attempted to remove records of their involvement in the accident from Wikipedia a day after the incident.

A day after the accident, the Director of Land Transportation, Aan Suhanan, conducted a surprise inspection of Green SM's depot in Bekasi. The Ministry of Transportation also summoned Green SM's leadership in Indonesia to "evaluate" the company's operations. If deemed to fall short of safety and operational standards, the Ministry of Transportation may revoke Green SM's licence to operate in Indonesia.

The Head of Public Relations of the Greater Jakarta Metropolitan Regional Police, Police Commissioner Budi Hermanto, later stated that the taxi driver involved in the train crash had been employed by Green SM for just two days and had only undergone one day of basic training. On 21 May 2026, Chief of Traffic Police at the Bekasi Metro Police, Gefri Agitia, stated that the police had named the Green SM taxi driver involved in the train accident in Bekasi as a suspect, as he was deemed negligent.

== Partners ==
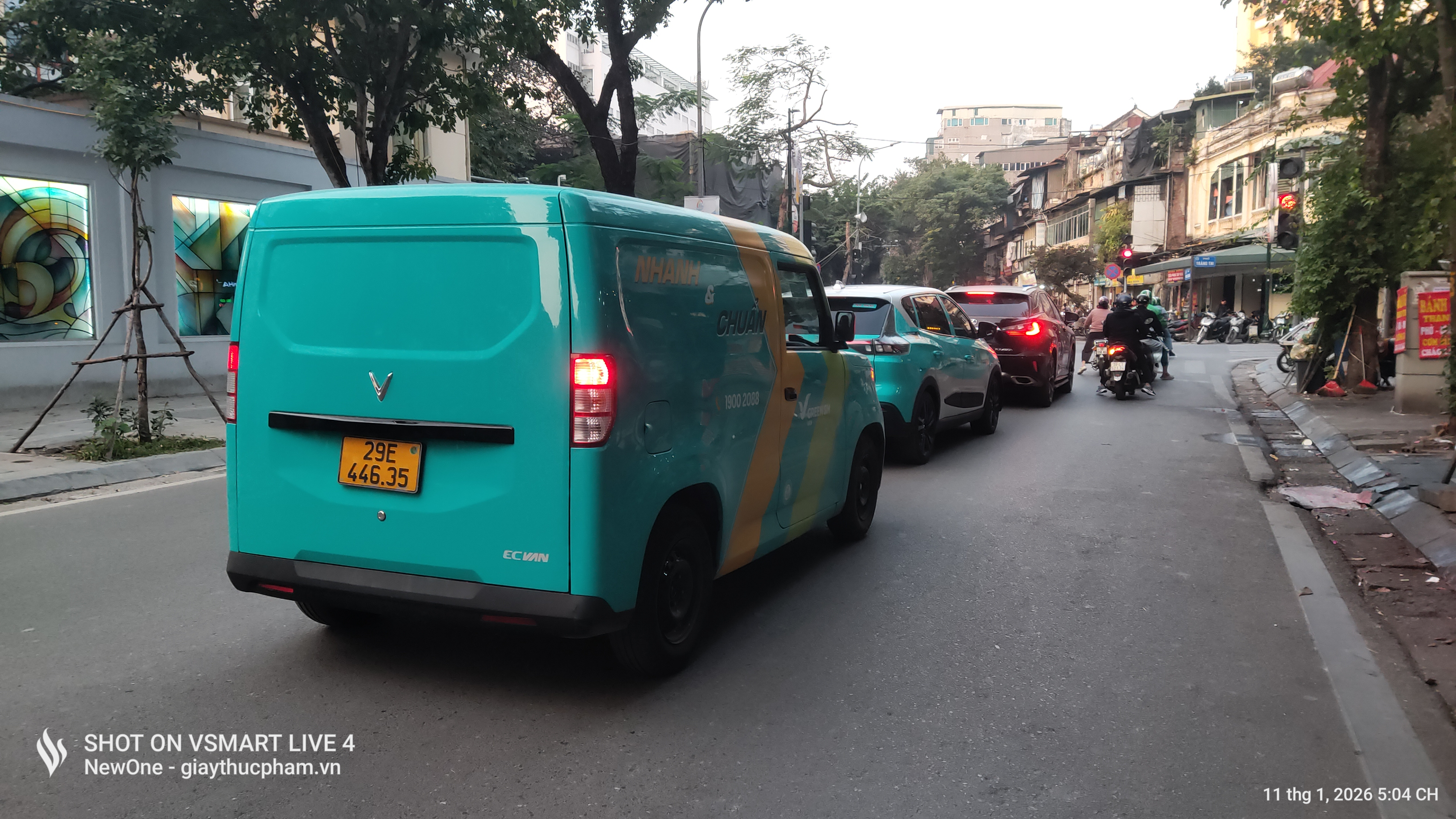
A Green SM EC Van following an VF e34 operating under the same color in 2026.

=== Be Group ===
Xanh SM directly invests in Be Group to support its partner. Additionally, through financial partners, Xanh SM will assist Be Group drivers in transitioning from gasoline-powered vehicles to electric vehicles.

=== Lado Taxi ===
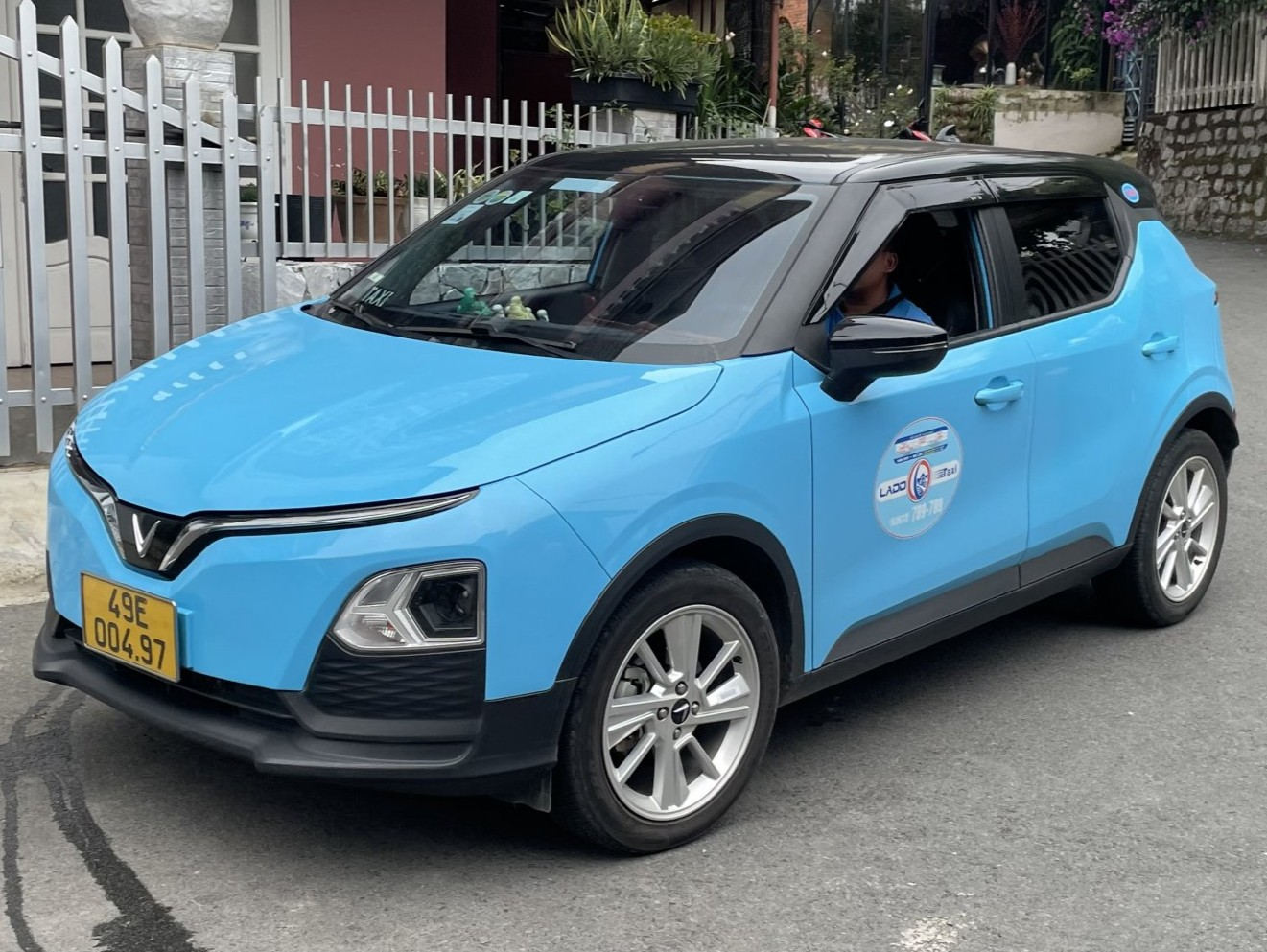
A Lado-operated VF5 taxi in Da Lat city, Lâm Đồng

Lado Taxi signed a contract to lease and purchase electric cars with Xanh SM and VinFast, aiming to expand its business operations on the morning of March 27, 2023. Lado Taxi ordered 40 VF e34 cars and signed a lease contract for 300 VF e34 cars and 200 VF 5 Plus cars from Xanh SM. The lease term is 42 months from the contract signing date, with the option to extend based on actual usage needs.

=== Ahamove ===
Ahamove Joint Stock Company officially received 200 VinFast Feliz S electric motorcycles, which were purchased directly from VinFast to serve Ahamove's electric vehicle (EV Rental) plan in the city of Đà Nẵng. Additionally, Ahamove's owning company is also negotiating a contract to lease an additional 1,000 VinFast electric motorcycles from Xanh SM to expand its business operations.

=== Én Vàng ===
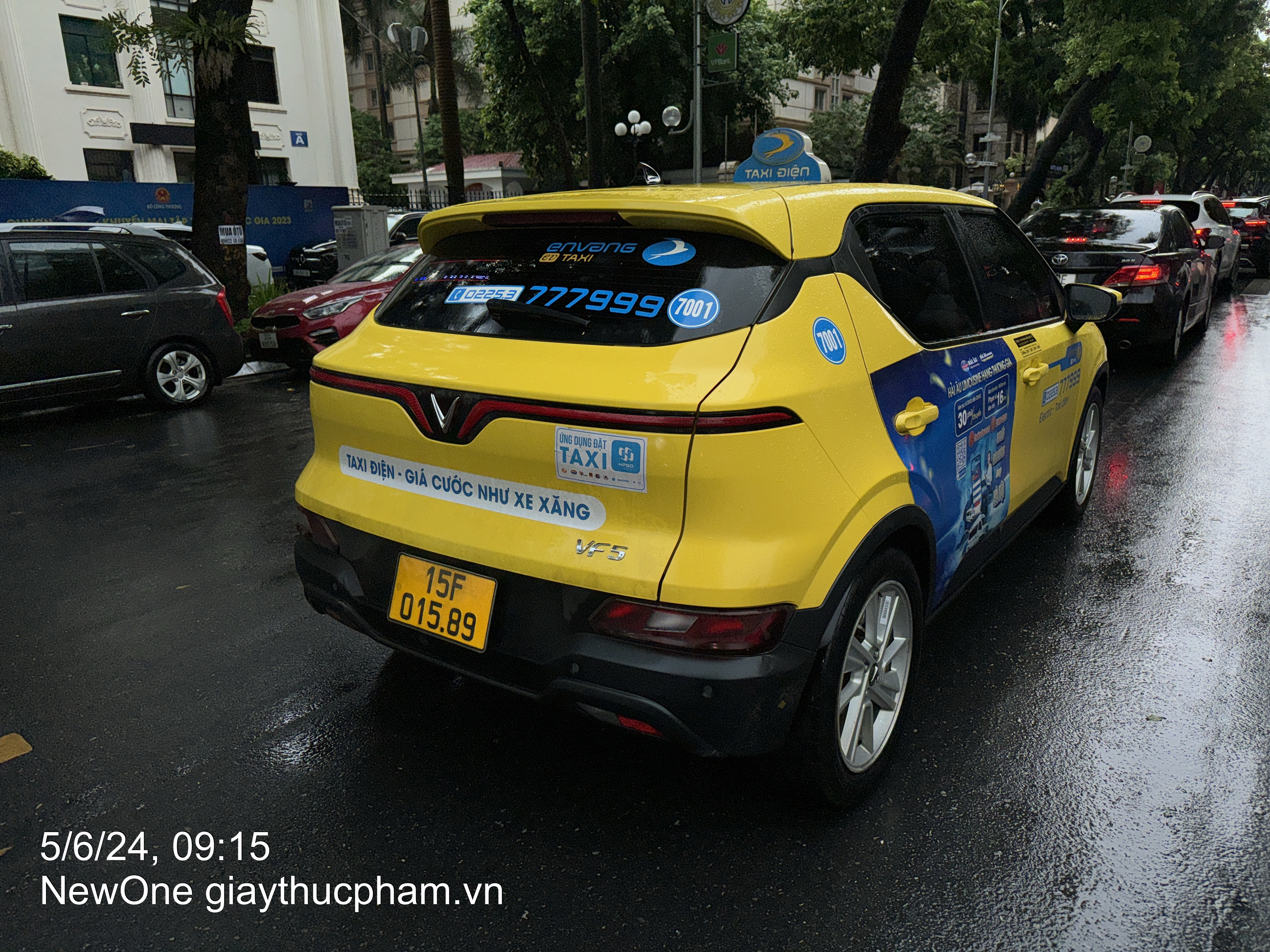
An Én Vàng-operated VF 5 taxi.

On April 28, 2023, Haiphong-based company Én Vàng (lit. 'Yellow Swallow' or 'Golden Swallow') signed a contract to purchase 25 VF e34 and VF 5 Plus cars from VinFast, and also signed a memorandum of understanding to lease 125 electric cars from Xanh SM in 2023.

=== Taxi Xanh Sapa ===
On September 22, 2023, Sa Pa's Thanh Thủy Co., Ltd signed contracts and memorandums of understanding with Xanh SM and VinFast to purchase and lease 250 VinFast VF e34 and VF 5 Plus electric cars from VinFast and Xanh SM in 2023 and 2024. Taxi Xanh Sapa is also expected to appear on the Xanh SM application platform.

=== Gojek ===
In June 2025, Green SM collaborated with the Indonesian ride-hailing company Gojek, enabling Gojek users in the Jakarta metropolitan area, Surabaya, and Makassar to order Green SM taxis directly through the Gojek app.

== See also ==
- Grab Holdings
- Uber
- Bluebird Group
