= NextBillion =

NextBillion.ai
- Industry: Geospatial technology
- Founded: 2020
- Founders: Ajay Bulusu, Gaurav Bubna, Shaolin Zheng
- Headquarters: Marina Way, Singapore
- Area served: Worldwide
- Key people: Ajay Bulusu (Co-Founder) Gaurav Bubna (Co-Founder) Shaolin Zheng (CTO and Co-Founder)
- Website: nextbillion.ai

NextBillion.ai is a Singapore-based geospatial technology company founded in 2020 by Ajay Bulusu, Gaurav Bubna, and Shaolin Zheng, who had previously worked at Grab. The company develops software and application programming interfaces (APIs) for mapping, routing, navigation, and location-based applications.

== History ==
NextBillion was founded in 2020 by Ajay Bulusu, Gaurav Bubna, and Shaolin Zheng. The founders had previously worked on mapping and location-based technologies at Grab, a Southeast Asian ride-hailing and delivery platform. During the COVID-19 pandemic, the company faced challenges in acquiring customers and conducting in-person business meetings. The company was headquartered in Singapore and had offices in Bengaluru, Hyderabad, and Beijing.

The company raised US$7 million in a Series A round in June 2020, US$6.25 million in a Series A extension in May 2021, and US$21 million in a Series B round in May 2022.

In 2025, US-based technology company Velocitor Solutions acquired NextBillion in an all-cash transaction. Later, Velocitor and NextBillion combined Velocitor's hardware with NextBillion's routing technology while retaining separate branding.

== Technology ==
NextBillion develops software for mapping and route planning. Its systems can incorporate mapping data and additional spatial information, including vehicle restrictions, turn restrictions, and information about private access points. The company has used OpenStreetMap data and traffic information from third-party providers in its mapping and routing products. Among its products are APIs for calculating distances between locations and software for route optimization and asset tracking.
