= Dante's Inferno: Abandon All Hope =

- Dante and Virgil at the gate of hell.
- Directed by: Boris Acosta
- Based on: Inferno by Dante Alighieri
- Produced by: Boris Acosta
- Starring: Vittorio Matteucci; Vincent Spano; Armand Mastroianni; Jenn Gotzon; Lalo Cibelli; Nia Peeples; Diane Salinger; Martin Kove; Jsu Garcia; Stella Stevens
- Narrated by: Jeff Conaway
- Cinematography: Angelo Acosta
- Edited by: Angelo Acosta
- Music by: Aldo De Tata
- Production companies: Gotimna Productions, LLC
- Distributed by: Gotimna Productions, LLC
- Release date: January 14, 2010
- Running time: 42 minutes
- Country: United States
- Languages: English; Italian

Dante's Inferno: Abandon All Hope is a 2010 black and white film produced and directed by Boris Acosta. The story is based on the first part of Dante Alighieri's Divine Comedy - Inferno.

== Plot ==
This film is Dante's journey through the afterlife, Inferno. It is a descent to Hell, circle by circle to Purgatory. It features Dore's illustrations and excerpts from "L'Inferno".

== Cast ==
- Dino Di Durante as Introduced by
- Vittorio Matteucci as Dante
- Lalo Cibelli as Virgil
- Jenn Gotzon as Beatrice
- Gianmario Pagano as Charon, The Ferryman
- Jeff Conaway as Circles Introduction
- Zan Calabretta as 2nd Circle, The Lustful
- Amy Lucas as 3rd Cirble, The Gluttons
- Diane Salinger as The Furies
- Vanna Bonta as 6th and 7th Circles
- Vincent Spano as 7th Circle, The Murderers
- Jsu Garcia as 7th Circle, The Blasphemers
- Leslie Garza as 8th Circle, The Hypocrites
- Stella Stevens as 8th Circle, The Thieves
- Paul Lynch (director) as 8th Circle, The Falsifiers
- Martin Kove as 8th Circle, The Sowers of Discord
- Armand Mastroianni as 9th Circle, The Traitors
- Nia Peeples as Exit into Purgatory
- An early version of this film was introduced as a work-in-progress at the Market of the Cannes Film Festival in 2008.
