= Tan Hooi Ling =

Entrepreneur known for co-founding ridesharing company Grab

- 陈慧玲
- Education: University of Bath (BEng); Harvard Business School (MBA)
- Occupations: Businesswoman, management consultant
- Known for: Co-founding Grab
- Title: COO of Grab

Tan Hooi Ling (Chinese: 陈慧玲; pinyin: Chén Huìlíng; Pe̍h-ōe-jī: Tân Hūi-lêng) is a Singaporean businesswoman. She is best known as the co-founder and Chief Operating Officer (COO) of Singaporean ride-hailing company, Grab Holdings Inc. Tan was a business analyst at McKinsey & Company before she co-founded Grab with Anthony Tan while attending Harvard Business School.

== Early life ==
Tan was born and raised in a middle-class Malaysian Chinese household in Kuala Lumpur by a civil engineer father and a remisier mother alongside an older brother, who is now a computer programmer based in New Zealand. Tan is the youngest of two children in her family who went to state-schools while living in Petaling Jaya.

Raised in Kuala Lumpur, Tan moved to the United Kingdom to attend the University of Bath where she earned a bachelor's degree in mechanical engineering. After graduation, she landed a job at McKinsey and Company in Malaysia. McKinsey later sponsored Tan's MBA education at Harvard Business School, where she met future Grab co-founder Anthony Tan. The two would both subsequently move to Singapore in 2014.

== Education ==
Tan attended the University of Bath and graduated in 2006 with a bachelor's degree in mechanical engineering. She later graduated from Harvard Business School with a Master of Business Administration in 2011.

== Career ==
=== Eli Lilly ===
While studying at the University of Bath, Tan took a year off school to do an industrial placement at Eli Lilly in Basingstoke. Her time at the pharmaceutical company taught Tan that decisions were made at the management level and motivated her to change her career trajectory and research graduate finance and management programs in order to incorporate engineering perspectives into business decisions, thus having the power to make changes at the management level.

=== McKinsey ===
Despite not knowing what the company did, Tan signed up for an event held by consulting firm McKinsey & Company in Malaysia, eventually landing a job with the company where she performed incredibly well that they sponsored her MBA education at Harvard Business School - where she met fellow Malaysian and future co-founder of Grab, Anthony Tan, in the class of 2011.

=== Grab ===
While at Harvard Business School, Tan worked on a business plan with HBS classmate, Anthony Tan, for a "mobile app that connects taxi seekers directly with taxi drivers closest to their location in the chaotic Malaysian urban environment", which would later become GrabTaxi. The inspiration came from Tan's experiences with a lack of safety in Malaysia. When she was working at McKinsey, she and her mom developed a "manual GPS system" to track where she was while she was coming home. Tan would send her mom the car number plates and ping her when she passed any of the large milestones so her mom would know how far away she was. Every night her mom would stay up waiting for her to get back home because back then, when you searched "World's Worst Taxi" the top hit for the few pages was Kuala Lumpur, Malaysia.

The pair's business plan was the runner-up in the HBS New Venture Competition in 2011, winning $25,000. Using the proceeds from the competition and their own personal funds, Tan Hooi Ling and Anthony Tan launched the mobile application, first called MyTeksi, in June 2012.

Although the pair had started the company, Tan had to return to McKinsey after graduation to serve out her bond with the consulting firm as a condition of sponsoring her education. She later moved on to San Francisco-based software company Salesforce, while taking time out of her schedule at the company to help out Anthony with Grab in Southeast Asia. She returned to work full-time on Grab in 2015. Upon returning, she took on the title of COO, and focused on 3 key areas - product, human resources, and customer experience. In May 2023, she announced she will step down by the end of the year 2023.

== Personal life ==
Tan is a self-professed introvert, keeping a lower profile than her co-founder, Anthony Tan, but admitted she likes it that way. She also considers swing dancing, which she picked up in San Francisco, as one of her life accomplishments. Tan also plays the piano and violin, having a diploma in the former and a Grade 8 in the latter.
