= The Voice Teens (Philippine TV series) season 2 =

Season of television series

The Voice Teens
- Season 2
- Hosted by: Luis Manzano; Alex Gonzaga
- Coaches: apl.de.ap; Lea Salonga; Sarah Geronimo; Bamboo Mañalac
- Winners: Kendra Aguirre; Cydel Gabutero; Isang Manlapaz; Heart Salvador
- Runners-up: Yang-Yang Aloya; Kate Campo; Jaylloyd Garche; Alexia Tag-at

Release
- Original network: ABS-CBN (Ep. 1–12); Kapamilya Channel (Ep. 13–32)
- Original release: February 8 – August 16, 2020

Season chronology
- ← Previous; Season 1 Next → Season 3

The second season of the Philippine reality singing competition The Voice Teens aired on ABS-CBN and Kapamilya Channel from February 8 to August 16, 2020, replacing Your Moment and was replaced by Kadenang Ginto: The Golden Comeback. Lea Salonga, Bamboo Mañalac and Sarah Geronimo returned to the show as coaches. The Voice of the Philippines coach apl.de.ap returned to the franchise after four years of hiatus, replacing Sharon Cuneta. The show is hosted by Alex Gonzaga and Luis Manzano – the two have previously worked together as hosts of the first season of The Voice Kids.

On March 21, 2020, despite having already taped its episodes prior to the community quarantine, the show suspended airing its fresh episodes as part of the network's decision to halt the airing of taped/live episodes of its shows during the Enhanced community quarantine in Luzon, as part of the country's fight against the COVID-19 pandemic in the Philippines. Its timeslot was temporarily replaced by the re-run of the Kids' first season of Your Face Sounds Familiar (both Saturdays and Sundays) and sixth season of Pilipinas Got Talent (on Sundays only) until May 3, 2020, when ABS-CBN's free TV and Radio stations were forced off the air 2 days later. The season returned on June 13, 2020, via cable television.

The finale was aired on August 15 to 16, 2020. Heart Salvador of Kamp Kawayan, Cydel Gabutero of FamiLEA, Isang Manlapaz of Team Apl, and Kendra Aguirre of Team Sarah were declared as co-champions, as the finale ended up being pre-recorded instead of being staged live due to COVID-19 pandemic-induced restrictions.

== Changes ==
=== Coaches' Line-up ===
The coaches of the second season of The Voice Teens

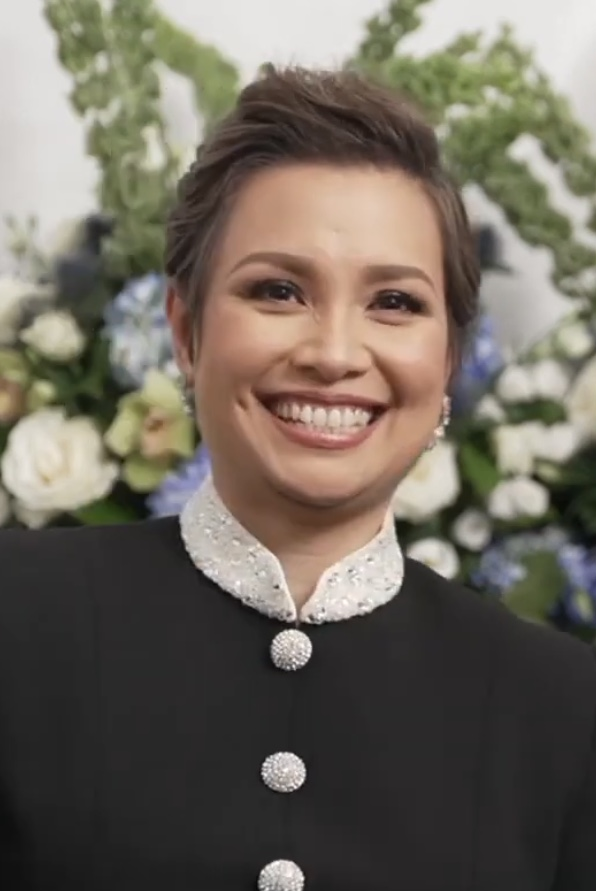
Lea Salonga

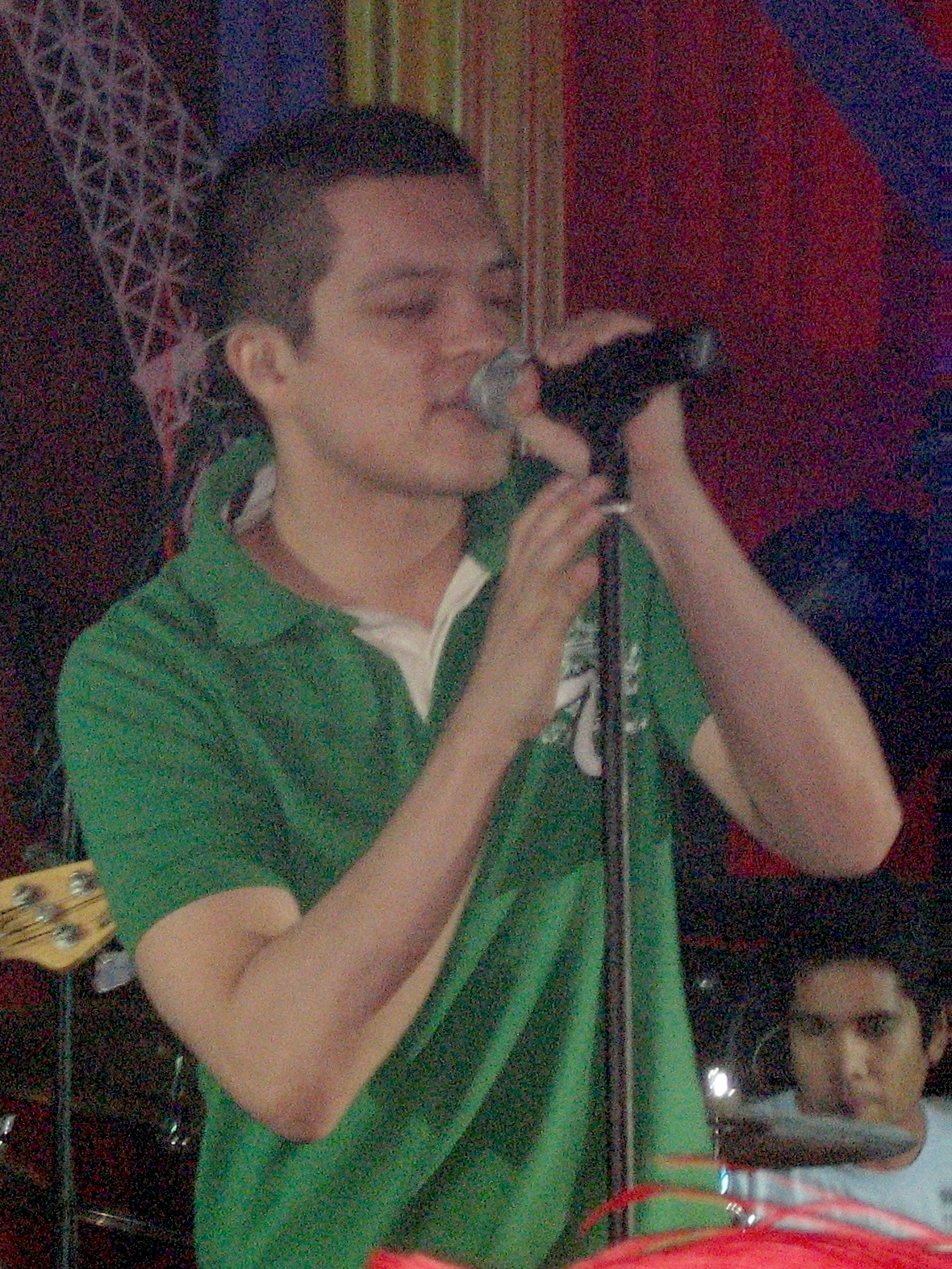
Bamboo Mañalac

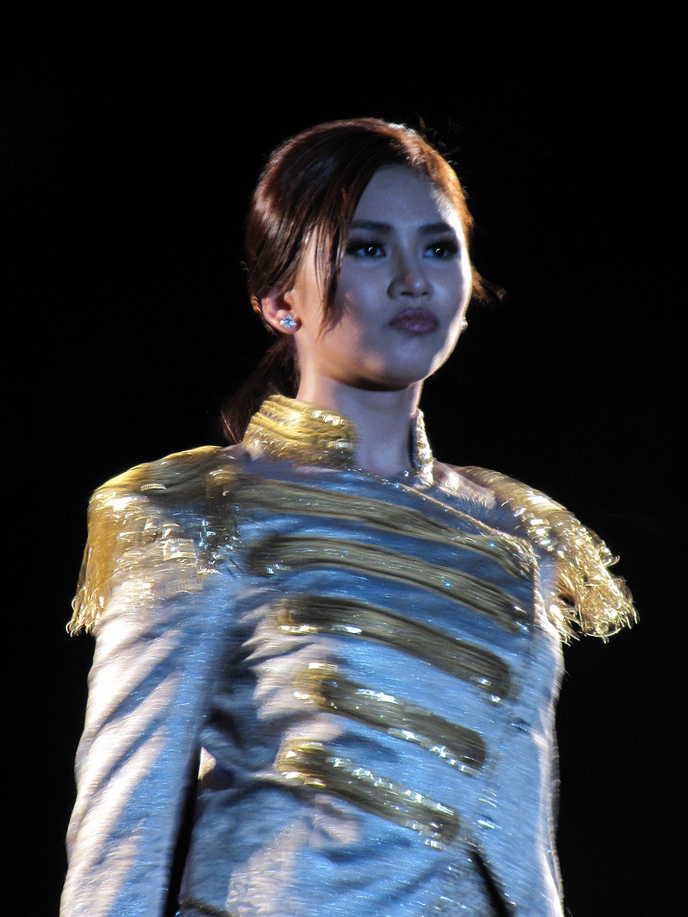
Sarah Geronimo

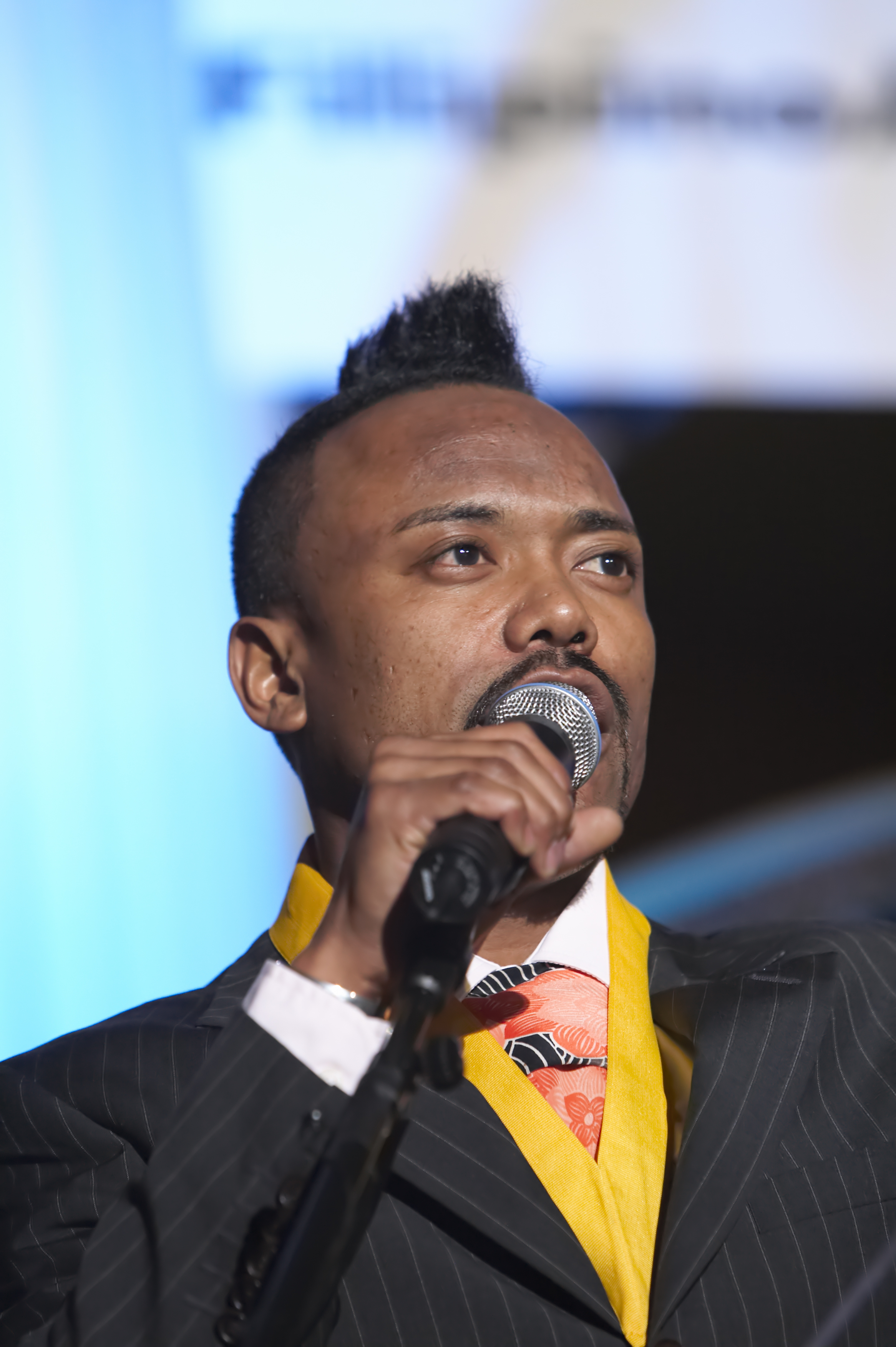
apl.de.ap

In her column on December 19, 2019, it was confirmed that Lea Salonga will return to the show, alongside Bamboo Mañalac and Sarah Geronimo. They returned for their eighth, eighth, and seventh season of the franchise, respectively. It was also published that Apl.de.ap, one of the original coaches of The Voice of the Philippines, along with Salonga, Mañalac, and Geronimo, is set to return for his third season in the franchise, after four years of hiatus, replacing Sharon Cuneta.

=== Hosts ===
Luis Manzano returned as host while Alex Gonzaga replaced her sister, Toni Gonzaga, as host. The two have previously teamed up on the first season of The Voice Kids.

=== Mechanics ===
Several mechanics were changed since the first season. A new feature added in the Blind Auditions this season is the Block. Each coach is given two blocks to prevent one coach from getting a contestant. Also, each teams were increased to 16 members each, bringing the total of artists to 64.

Following the return of Apl.de.ap in the coaching panel, a monitor was installed on his red chair just like in the previous seasons of The Voice of the Philippines. This is to help him see the artists while performing since he is legally blind. The monitor turns on only upon pressing his button.

It was announced that the format of the live shows was supposed to change, but no further details were given. However, the Live Shows were changed to a pre-recorded work from home finale as a result of difficulties/restrictions caused the coronavirus pandemic.

=== Online show ===
The online show entitled The Voice Teens DigiTV returns with KaladKaren Davila and Jeremy Glinoga. The pair has also previously hosted the online show for the fourth season of The Voice Kids. However, the 11th and 12th episodes were aired without a live feed of DigiTV as Metro Manila was placed under a partial lockdown in order to control the spread of COVID-19.

However, when the show resumed airing following the launch of Kapamilya Channel, The Voice Teens DigiTV resumed live via Zoom.

=== Community quarantine suspension ===
Due to the COVID-19 pandemic in the Philippines, the government announced on March 12, 2020, that Metro Manila would be locked down on March 15, 2020. Due to this, the March 14 and 15 episodes aired without a live feed of The Voice Teens DigiTV, while the March 15 episode lasted for 105 minutes instead of 75.

However, when the entire Luzon was placed under an enhanced community quarantine, The Voice Teens suspended its telecast from March 21, 2020, despite taping its episodes prior to the enhanced community quarantine, in which the first season of Your Face Sounds Familiar Kids, filled its timeslot as part of the network's ECQ Special Programming, along with sixth season of Pilipinas Got Talent (on Sundays only) until the closure of ABS-CBN due to the cease and desist order issued by the National Telecommunications Commission on account of its franchise expiration.

== Teams ==
- Winners
- Runners-up
- Third placers
- Eliminated in The Knockouts
- Stolen in the Battle rounds
- Eliminated in the Battle rounds
- Withdrew

Coaches	Top 64 artists				
apl.de.ap					
apl.de.ap	Isang Manlapaz	Yang-Yang Aloya	Calvin Candelaria	CZ Baylosis	Matt Reyes
apl.de.ap	Jessie Gonzales	Hana Adriano	Noielle Rodriguez	Tyson Venegas	Ella Mayor
apl.de.ap	Jelo Acosta	Mimi Mondejar	Bella Micucci	Ella Sabroso	Hakki Patricio
apl.de.ap	Drei Sugay	Josh Nubla			
Lea Salonga					
Lea Salonga	Cydel Gabutero	Alexia Tag-at	Kristian Rajagopal	Aaron Regala	Andre Eusebio
Lea Salonga	JP Romero	Josh Labing-isa	Tina Umali	Airene Bautista	~~Pia Banga~~
Lea Salonga	Ericka Peralejo	Klynn Pineda	Rafael Mumar	Ken Semira	Lukas Magallano
Lea Salonga	Alliah Maratas	Alexis Mingming			
Sarah Geronimo					
Sarah Geronimo	Kendra Aguirre	Jaylloyd Garche	Andre Parker	Pia Banga	Ryan Dave Baguio
Sarah Geronimo	Hobe Rementizo	Eunice Encarnada	John Van Lapu	Ceejay Castillo	~~Andre Eusebio~~
Sarah Geronimo	~~Hana Adriano~~	~~Kate Campo~~	Ten-Ten Pesigan	Johnray Castiller	Russel Solis
Sarah Geronimo	Yohann Rulona	Jason Villanueva			
Bamboo Mañalac					
Bamboo Mañalac	Heart Salvador	Kate Campo	Rock Opong	Aly Fabellar	Dani Dixon
Bamboo Mañalac	Gab Cayabyab	Jayne Sajulla	Vincent Gregorio	Zam Lago	Ysa Jison
Bamboo Mañalac	Clare Siggaoat	Omar Arsua	Ceray Olaco	Cha Apag	Darvic Villarin
Bamboo Mañalac	Kate Soliman	AJ Yape			
Note: Italicized names are stolen artists (names struck through within former teams).

== Blind auditions ==
The Blind auditions were taped from December 14, 2019, to December 18, 2019. Around 120 artists auditioned for this season. A new feature within the Blind Auditions this season is the Block, which each coach can use twice to prevent one of the other coaches from getting a contestant.

Color key

✔	Coach pressed "I WANT YOU" button
	Artist joined this coach's team
	Artist defaulted to this coach's team
	Artist eliminated as no coach pressing their button
✘	Coach pressed "I WANT YOU" button, but was blocked by another coach from getting the artist
	Blocked by apl.de.ap; Blocked by Lea; Blocked by Sarah; Blocked by Bamboo

=== Episode 1 (February 8) ===
The coaches performed a cover of "Superheroes" at the start of the show.

Order	Artist	Age	Hometown	Song	Coach's and artist's choices			
Order	Artist	Age	Hometown	Song	apl.de.ap	Lea	Sarah	Bamboo
1	Matt Reyes	16	Las Piñas	"Weak"	✔^{[a]}	✔	✔	✔
2	Ysa Jison	16	Bacolod	"Isa Pang Araw"	—	—	✔	✔
3	CK Arcelo	16	Cebu City	"Having You Near Me"	—	—	—	—
4	Pia Banga	14	Davao	"The Power Of Love"	✔	✔	✘	✔

Notes
a. Lea pressed her block button for Apl.de.ap. Based on the actual taping order, Lea had no blocks left at that moment. Therefore, Apl.de.ap was still able to turn and get the artist.

=== Episode 2 (February 9) ===
Order	Artist	Age	Hometown	Song	Coach's and artist's choices			
Order	Artist	Age	Hometown	Song	apl.de.ap	Lea	Sarah	Bamboo
1	Jaylloyd Garche	16	Bacolod	"Kung Sakali"	—	✔	✔	—
2	Andrei Eusebio	17	General Mariano Alvarez, Cavite	"Superstar"	✔	✔	✔	—
3	Yang-Yang Aloya	17	Lipa, Batangas	"Bulag, Pipi at Bingi"	✔	—	—	—
4	AJ Yape	17	Cavite	"Top of the World"	—	✔	✔	✔

=== Episode 3 (February 15) ===
Order	Artist	Age	Hometown	Song	Coach's and artist's choices			
Order	Artist	Age	Hometown	Song	apl.de.ap	Lea	Sarah	Bamboo
1	Ryan Dave Baguio	14	Bukidnon	"Hello"	—	✔	✔	—
2	Gabriel Anduyan	15	Davao	"Can't Take My Eyes Off You"	—	—	—	—
3	Clare Siggaoat	13	Malasiqui, Pangasinan	"Rise Up"	✔	✔	✔	✔
4	Ten-Ten Pesigan	14	Alitagtag, Batangas	"Killing Me Softly with His Song"	✔	✔	✔	✔

=== Episode 4 (February 16) ===
Order	Artist	Age	Hometown	Song	Coach's and artist's choices			
Order	Artist	Age	Hometown	Song	apl.de.ap	Lea	Sarah	Bamboo
1	JP Romero	15	Cagayan de Oro	"Usahay"	—	✔	✔	—
2	Jhomarie Buhisan	17	Zamboanga del Sur	"Ikaw Sana"	—	—	—	—
3	Gab Cayabyab	13	Antipolo	"Demonyo"	—	✔	✔	✔
4	Isang Manlapaz	15	Sucat, Muntinlupa	"Isang Linggong Pag-ibig"	✔	✔	✔	✘

=== Episode 5 (February 22) ===
Order	Artist	Age	Hometown	Song	Coach's and artist's choices			
Order	Artist	Age	Hometown	Song	apl.de.ap	Lea	Sarah	Bamboo
1	Jelo Acosta	17	Quezon City	"Nadarang"	✔	—	—	✔
2	Ericka Peralejo	14	Imus, Cavite	"Pahiram ng Isang Kanta"	—	✔	—	—
3	Andrei Lunar	14	Cuenca, Batangas	"Kahit Isang Saglit"	—	—	—	—
4	Ceray Olaco	17	Misamis Oriental	"Ikaw at Ako"	✔	✔	✔	✔

=== Episode 6 (February 23) ===
Note: This timeslot aired at 8:45 p.m. of the pilot episode of 24/7 which runs for 105 minutes instead of 75.

Order	Artist	Age	Hometown	Song	Coach's and artist's choices			
Order	Artist	Age	Hometown	Song	apl.de.ap	Lea	Sarah	Bamboo
1	Rock Opong	13	Iloilo	"Sa Ngalan ng Pag-ibig"	✔	—	—	✔
2	Aly Fabellar	15	Novaliches, Quezon City	"Diamonds"	—	—	—	✔
3	Noielle Rodriguez	16	Legazpi City, Albay	"Stone Cold"	✔	✔	✘	✔
4	Dana Delos Reyes	14	Taguig	"Somewhere Over the Rainbow"	—	—	—	—
5	Tyson Venegas	14	Vancouver, Canada	"A Change Is Gonna Come"	✔	✔	✔	—

=== Episode 7 (February 29) ===
Order	Artist	Age	Hometown	Song	Coach's and artist's choices			
Order	Artist	Age	Hometown	Song	apl.de.ap	Lea	Sarah	Bamboo
1	CZ Baylosis	16	Zamboanga City	"Halik sa Hangin"	✔	—	—	—
2	Amaia Luisa Brown	13	Parañaque	"idontwannabeyouanymore"	—	—	—	—
3	Russel Solis	16	Baguio	"Dito sa Puso Ko"	—	—	✔	—
4	Klynn Pineda	17	Baguio	"How Would You Feel"	—	✔	—	—
5	Kate Campo	13	Angono, Rizal	"Pusong Ligaw"	✔	✔	✔	—

=== Episode 8 (March 1) ===
This episode returned to the 8:15 p.m. timeslot while 24/7 runs for 75 minutes.

Order	Artist	Age	Hometown	Song	Coach's and artist's choices			
Order	Artist	Age	Hometown	Song	apl.de.ap	Lea	Sarah	Bamboo
1	Cydel Gabutero	16	San Carlos City, Negros Occidental	"Angel"	—	✔	✔	—
2	Kate Soliman	17	Digos, Davao del Sur	"Moon River"	✔	✔	✔	✔
3	Prince Cambalon	17	Davao	"Binalewala"	—	—	—	—
4	Zam Lago	15	Cagayan de Oro	"All I Want"	✔	—	—	✔
5	Alexia Tag-at	17	Talisay, Cebu	"Nosi Balasi"	✘	✔	—	—

=== Episode 9 (March 7) ===
Order	Artist	Age	Hometown	Song	Coach's and artist's choices			
Order	Artist	Age	Hometown	Song	apl.de.ap	Lea	Sarah	Bamboo
1	Ella Alcantara	14	Cagayan de Oro	"No One"	—	—	—	—
2	Drei Sugay	16	San Juan	"Maybe the Night"	✔	—	—	—
3	Eunice Encarnada	16	Oroquieta, Misamis Occidental	"Feeling Good"	✔	—	✔	—
4	Jessie Gonzales	16	Hong Kong	"Titibo-Tibo"	✔	✔	✔	✘

=== Episode 10 (March 8) ===
Order	Artist	Age	Hometown	Song	Coach's and artist's choices			
Order	Artist	Age	Hometown	Song	apl.de.ap	Lea	Sarah	Bamboo
1	Darvic Villarin	15	Zamboanga Sibugay	"Wag Ka Ng Umiyak"	—	—	—	✔
2	Jayne Sajulla	14	Iloilo	"Ang Buhay Ko"	—	—	—	✔
3	Kendra Aguirre	13	Las Piñas	"Proud Mary"	—	—	✔	✔
4	Dani Dixon	13	Sibagat, Agusan del Sur	"May Bukas Pa"	—	—	—	✔
5	Ceejay Castillo	15	Muntinlupa	"Don't You Remember"	✔	✔	✔	✔
6	Chky Bagaygay	16	Agusan del Sur	"Fallin'"	—	—	—	—
7	Hakki Patricio	14	Bugallon, Pangasinan	"The House of the Rising Sun"	✔	✔	✔	—

=== Episode 11 (March 14) ===
For this episode and the following episode, the episode aired without a feed of The Voice Teens DigiTV due to the community quarantine being implemented in response to the COVID-19 pandemic. However, the livestream of the televised series continued on Facebook and YouTube.

Order	Artist	Age	Hometown	Song	Coach's and artist's choices			
Order	Artist	Age	Hometown	Song	apl.de.ap	Lea	Sarah	Bamboo
1	Josh Labing-isa	17	Dubai, United Arab Emirates	"Paano"	—^{[a]}	✔	—	—
2	Ella Sabroso	15	Davao	"Hallelujah"	✔	—	—	—
3	Mike Justine Recabo	13	Bukidnon	"Saan Darating ang Umaga?"	—	—	—	—
4	Ken Semira	17	Rodriguez, Rizal	"So Sick"	—	✔	—	—
5	Aaron Regala	14	Batangas	"Tagpuan"	—	✔	—	—
6	Hana Adriano	17	Las Piñas	"Tadhana"	—	—	✔	✔

Notes
a. Lea pressed her block button for Apl.de.ap but he did not turn.

=== Episode 12 (March 15) ===
This episode aired particularly longer from the usual 75 minutes to 100 minutes due to the postponement of Everybody Sing! because of the COVID-19 pandemic-induced Community quarantine.

Order	Artist	Age	Hometown	Song	Coach's and artist's choices			
Order	Artist	Age	Hometown	Song	apl.de.ap	Lea	Sarah	Bamboo
1	Lukas Magallano	14	Quezon City	"Riptide"	✔	✔	—	—^{[a]}
2	Calvin Candelaria	15	Libmanan, Camarines Sur	"Nais Ko"	✔	✔	—	—
3	Max Abliter	17	Bacoor, Cavite	"Hindi Na Nga"	—	—	—	—
4	Ella Mayor	13	Santa Clara, California, United States	"Don't Rain on My Parade"	✔	✘	✔	—
5	Johnray Castiller	14	Bacolod	"Kahit Maputi Na Ang Buhok Ko"	—	✔	✔	—
6	Alliah Maratas	17	Bacolod	"Tagpuan"	—	✔	—	✔

Notes
a. Lea pressed her block button for Bamboo but he did not turn.

=== Episode 13 (June 13) ===
Despite being taped before the enhanced community quarantine, the airing of the episode was postponed from March 21 to June 13, 2020, due to the Enhanced community quarantine in Luzon, in which, reruns of the first season of Your Face Sounds Familiar Kids PH took over its timeslot for the duration of the ECQ. It was further deferred by the cease and desist order caused by the non-renewal of the ABS-CBN franchise. However, it resumed airing on June 13, 2020, via the Kapamilya Channel. The Voice Teens DigiTV also returned, albeit via remote work arrangement through Zoom.

Order	Artist	Age	Hometown	Song	Coach's and artist's choices			
Order	Artist	Age	Hometown	Song	apl.de.ap	Lea	Sarah	Bamboo
1	Alexis Mingming	15	Bacolod	"Magasin"	—	✔	—	—^{[a]}
2	Shaira Simbajon	15	Bohol	"Mabagal"	—	—	—	—
3	John Van Lapu	16	Sultan Kudarat	"Counting Stars"	—	✔	✔	—
4	Rafael Mumar	14	Bohol	"Panalangin"	—	✔	—	—
5	Omar Arsua	17	Misamis Oriental	"Wag Ka Na Umiyak"	—	✔	—	✔
6	Ken Abalos	13	Tarlac	"Bakit Ba Ikaw"	—	—	—	—
7	Kristian Rajagopal	14	Surigao, Surigao del Norte	"Kailangan Kita"	✔	✔	✘	✔

Notes
a. Lea pressed her block button for Bamboo but he did not turn.

=== Episode 14 (June 14) ===
Order	Artist	Age	Hometown	Song	Coach's and artist's choices			
Order	Artist	Age	Hometown	Song	apl.de.ap	Lea	Sarah	Bamboo
1	Bella Micucci	15	Sydney, Australia	"Perfect"	✔	—	—	—
2	Biggy Estacion	16	Negros Occidental	"Halik sa Hangin"	—	—	—	—
3	Vince Masayon	15	Iligan	"Mabagal"	—	—	—	—
4	Daph Bonotano	14	Bacolod	"Two Less Lonely People in the World"	—	—	—	—
5	Yohann Rulona	13	Butuan	"Bakit Ba Ikaw"	—	—	✔	—
6	Airene Bautista	15	Alubijid, Misamis Oriental	"Don't Rain on My Parade"	—	✔	✔	—
7	Hobe Rementizo	16	Lapu-Lapu	"One and Only"	✔	✔	✔	✔

=== Episode 15 (June 20) ===
Order	Artist	Age	Hometown	Song	Coach's and artist's choices			
Order	Artist	Age	Hometown	Song	apl.de.ap	Lea	Sarah	Bamboo
1	Josh Nubla	15	Imus, Cavite	"Can't Help Falling in Love"	✔	—	—	—
2	Cha Apag	14	Cagayan de Oro, Misamis Oriental	"Bukas na Lang Kita Mamahalin"	—	—	—	✔
3	Jep Manila	16	Koronadal, South Cotabato	"Ililigtas Ka Nya"	—	—	—	—
4	Ken Sarip	17	Valencia, Bukidnon	"Kung Maibabalik Ko Lang"	—	—	—	—
5	Jason Villanueva	17	Butuan	"Magkasuyo Buong Gabi"	—	✔	✔	—
6	Heart Salvador	13	Muntinlupa, Metro Manila	"Someone You Loved"	✔	✔	✔	✔

=== Episode 16 (June 21) ===
At the end of the blind auditions, Bamboo was not able to use his second block.

Order	Artist	Age	Hometown	Song	Coach's and artist's choices			
Order	Artist	Age	Hometown	Song	apl.de.ap	Lea	Sarah	Bamboo
1	Mimi Mondejar	16	Bukidnon	"'Di Na Muli"	✔	—	—	—
2	Tina Umali	16	Santa Clarita, California, United States	"Isa Pang Araw"	Team full	✔	✔	—
3	Andre Parker	15	Antipolo	"Feeling Good"	Team full	Team full	✔	—
4	Gold Ruaya	15	Siargao	"Sana Maulit Muli"	Team full	Team full	Team full	—
5	Keon Tubana	17	Caloocan	"Hinahanap-Hanap Kita"	Team full	Team full	Team full	—
6	Danie Soliman	17	Cabanatuan	"Tatsulok"	Team full	Team full	Team full	—
7	Vincent Gregorio	14	Cagayan de Oro	"Kay Tagal"	Team full	Team full	Team full	✔

== The Battles ==
The Battles were filmed on February 24 and 25, 2020, with the band rehearsals filmed a week prior. The reveal of the battle pairings and the piano rehearsals took place in Aqua Planet in Pampanga and Enchanted Kingdom in Santa Rosa, Laguna. The power to steal continued this season though the coaches had one steal. Nine artists per team advanced to the Knockouts.

Color key:

Artist won the Battle and advanced to the Knockouts
Artist lost the Battle but was stolen by another coach and advanced to the Knockouts
Artist lost the Battle and was eliminated

Episode	Coach	Order	Winner	Song	Loser	'Steal' result			
Episode	Coach	Order	Winner	Song	Loser	apl.de.ap	Lea	Sarah	Bamboo
Episode 17 (June 27)	Sarah Geronimo	1	John Van Lapu	"I Know What You Did Last Summer"	Ten-Ten Pesigan	—	—	N/A	—
Episode 17 (June 27)	Bamboo Mañalac	2	Jayne Sajulla	"Bata, Dahan-Dahan!"	Ysa Jison	—	—	—	N/A
Episode 17 (June 27)	Lea Salonga	3	Airene Bautista	"You Learn"	Ericka Peralejo	—	N/A	—	—
Episode 17 (June 27)	apl.de.ap	4	Calvin Candelaria	"New York State of Mind"	Ella Mayor	N/A	—	—	—
Episode 18 (June 28)	Bamboo Mañalac	1	Heart Salvador	"When the Party's Over"	Clare Siggaoat	—	—	—	N/A
Episode 18 (June 28)	Lea Salonga	2	Tina Umali	"I'll Be"	Klynn Pineda	—	N/A	—	—
Episode 18 (June 28)	apl.de.ap	3	CZ Baylosis	"Imposible"	Jelo Acosta	N/A	—	—	—
Episode 18 (June 28)	Sarah Geronimo	4	Jaylloyd Garche	"Istorya"	Kate Campo	✔	✔	N/A	✔
Episode 19 (July 4)	apl.de.ap	1	Isang Manlapaz	"Saan Ako Nagkamali"	Mimi Mondejar	N/A	—	—	Team full
Episode 19 (July 4)	Sarah Geronimo	2	Ceejay Castillo	"Stay"	Johnray Castiller	—	—	N/A	Team full
Episode 19 (July 4)	Bamboo Mañalac	3	Gab Cayabyab	"Happier"	Omar Arsua	—	—	—	Team full
Episode 19 (July 4)	Lea Salonga	4	Josh Labing-isa	"Hanggang Ngayon"	Pia Banga	—	N/A	✔	Team full
Episode 20 (July 5)	apl.de.ap	1	Jessie Gonzales	"Confident"	Bella Micucci	N/A	—	Team full	Team full
Episode 20 (July 5)	Lea Salonga	2	Aaron Regala	"Gusto Ko Lamang sa Buhay"	Rafael Mumar	—	N/A	Team full	Team full
Episode 20 (July 5)	Sarah Geronimo	3	Hobe Rementizo	"Muli"	Russel Solis	—	—	Team full	Team full
Episode 20 (July 5)	Bamboo Mañalac	4	Aly Fabellar	"Sunflower"	Ceray Olaco	—	—	Team full	Team full
Episode 21 (July 11)	apl.de.ap	1	Noielle Rodriguez	"You Oughta Know"	Ella Sabroso	N/A	—	Team full	Team full
Episode 21 (July 11)	Sarah Geronimo	2	Andre Parker	"Best Part"	Hana Adriano	✔	—	Team full	Team full
Episode 21 (July 11)	Lea Salonga	3	JP Romero	"214"	Ken Semira	Team full	N/A	Team full	Team full
Episode 21 (July 11)	Bamboo Mañalac	4	Dani Dixon	"Old Town Road"	Cha Apag	Team full	—	Team full	Team full
Episode 22 (July 12)	Sarah Geronimo	1	Eunice Encarnada	"Shallow"	Yohann Rulona	Team full	—	Team full	Team full
Episode 22 (July 12)	Lea Salonga	2	Kristian Rajagopal	"Beggin'"	Lukas Magallano	Team full	N/A	Team full	Team full
Episode 22 (July 12)	Bamboo Mañalac	3	Rock Opong	"Higher Love"	Darvic Villarin	Team full	—	Team full	Team full
Episode 22 (July 12)	apl.de.ap	4	Yang-Yang Aloya	"Sweet Dreams are Made of This"	Hakki Patricio	Team full	—	Team full	Team full
Episode 23 (July 18)	Lea Salonga	1	Alexia Tag-at	"So What"	Alliah Maratas	Team full	N/A	Team full	Team full
Episode 23 (July 18)	Bamboo Mañalac	2	Vincent Gregorio	"God Only Knows"	Kate Soliman	Team full	—	Team full	Team full
Episode 23 (July 18)	apl.de.ap	3	Matt Reyes	"Mad"	Drei Sugay	Team full	—	Team full	Team full
Episode 23 (July 18)	Sarah Geronimo	4	Kendra Aguirre	"The Closer I Get to You"	Jason Villanueva	Team full	—	Team full	Team full
Episode 24 (July 19)	Lea Salonga	1	Cydel Gabutero	"What About Love"	Alexis Mingming	Team full	N/A	Team full	Team full
Episode 24 (July 19)	Bamboo Mañalac	2	Zam Lago	"Araw-Araw"	AJ Yape	Team full	—	Team full	Team full
Episode 24 (July 19)	Sarah Geronimo	3	Ryan Dave Baguio	"Ordinary People"	Andre Eusebio	Team full	✔	Team full	Team full
Episode 24 (July 19)	apl.de.ap	4	Tyson Venegas	"A House Is Not a Home"	Josh Nubla	Team full	Team full	Team full	Team full

== The Knockouts ==
The Knockouts were filmed on February 28 and 29, 2020. The remaining artists were grouped into three by their respective coaches with one artist advancing to the Live Shows (which eventually was abolished in favor for the prerecorded Finale due to pandemic-induced restrictions) per group. Each artist got to pick their song. At the end of this round, three artists remained on each group with twelve artists overall advancing to the next round.

Lea Salonga was absent during the taping of her team's Knockout performances due to her tonsillitis. Salonga watched the recorded performances of her team on a later date to pick the winner for each Knockout grouping.

Tyson Venegas of Team Apl left the competition prior to the Knockouts due to undisclosed reasons. As a result, there were only two Knockout groups on Team Apl with one group composing of five artists with two artists being selected to advance to the next round.

With the advancement of Kate Campo, she became the first stolen artist to advance to the Finals in the entire Philippine franchise of The Voice. Furthermore, the advancement of Heart Salvador, Kate Campo and Rock Opong made Kamp Kawayan the first team to have 3 comeback artists to advance to the Finals in the entire Philippine franchise of The Voice.

Artist won the Knockout and advanced to the live shows
Artist lost the Knockout and was eliminated

Episode	Coach	Order	Song	Artists		Song
Episode	Coach	Order	Song	Winner	Losers	Song
Episode 25 (July 25)	Sarah Geronimo	1	"Hiling"	Jaylloyd Garche	Pia Banga	"Naririnig Mo Ba"
Episode 25 (July 25)	Sarah Geronimo	1	"Hiling"	Jaylloyd Garche	Ryan Dave Baguio	"Just Once"
Episode 25 (July 25)	Sarah Geronimo	2	"Vision of Love"	Kendra Aguirre	Hobe Rementizo	"Say Something"
Episode 25 (July 25)	Sarah Geronimo	2	"Vision of Love"	Kendra Aguirre	Eunice Encarnada	"Tattooed Heart"
Episode 26 (July 26)	Sarah Geronimo	3	"Make You Feel My Love"	Andre Parker	John Van Lapu	"Warrior Is a Child"
Episode 26 (July 26)	Sarah Geronimo	3	"Make You Feel My Love"	Andre Parker	Ceejay Castillo	"New Rules"
Episode 26 (July 26)	Bamboo Mañalac	1	"Skinny Love"	Heart Salvador	Aly Fabellar	"Banal na Aso, Santong Kabayo"
Episode 26 (July 26)	Bamboo Mañalac	1	"Skinny Love"	Heart Salvador	Dani Dixon	"Stuttering"
Episode 27 (August 1)	Bamboo Mañalac	2	"Chasing Pavements"	Kate Campo	Gab Cayabyab	"All of Me"
Episode 27 (August 1)	Bamboo Mañalac	2	"Chasing Pavements"	Kate Campo	Jayne Sajulla	"We Can't Stop"
Episode 27 (August 1)	Bamboo Mañalac	3	"Dancing on My Own"	Rock Opong	Vincent Gregorio	"Kisapmata"
Episode 27 (August 1)	Bamboo Mañalac	3	"Dancing on My Own"	Rock Opong	Zam Lago	"Scars to Your Beautiful"
Episode 28 (August 2)	Lea Salonga	1	"Huwag na Huwag Mong Sasabihin"	Alexia Tag-at	Aaron Regala	"Pagbigyang Muli"
Episode 28 (August 2)	Lea Salonga	1	"Huwag na Huwag Mong Sasabihin"	Alexia Tag-at	Andre Eusebio	"Kung Mawawala Ka"
Episode 28 (August 2)	Lea Salonga	2	"Kahit Ayaw Mo Na"	Cydel Gabutero	JP Romero	"Knocks Me Off My Feet"
Episode 28 (August 2)	Lea Salonga	2	"Kahit Ayaw Mo Na"	Cydel Gabutero	Josh Labing-isa	"Lay Me Down"
Episode 29 (August 8)	Lea Salonga	3	"What Kind of Fool Am I?"	Kristian Rajagopal	Tina Umali	"When We Were Young"
Episode 29 (August 8)	Lea Salonga	3	"What Kind of Fool Am I?"	Kristian Rajagopal	Airene Bautista	"Alone"
Episode 29 (August 8)	apl.de.ap	1	"Heaven"	Calvin Candelaria	CZ Baylosis	"MacArthur Park"
Episode 29 (August 8)	apl.de.ap	1	"Heaven"	Calvin Candelaria	Matt Reyes	"Bulong"
Episode 30 (August 9)	apl.de.ap	2	"If I Sing You a Love Song"	Yang-Yang Aloya	Jessie Gonzales	"Mahal Ko o Mahal Ako"
Episode 30 (August 9)	apl.de.ap	2	"If I Sing You a Love Song"	Yang-Yang Aloya	Hana Adriano	"Ocean Eyes"
Episode 30 (August 9)	apl.de.ap	2	"Roses"	Isang Manlapaz	Hana Adriano	"Ocean Eyes"
Episode 30 (August 9)	apl.de.ap	2	"Roses"	Isang Manlapaz	Noielle Rodriguez	"Tala"

== Finale ==
The live shows were originally slated to start in May 2020. However, due to the COVID-19 pandemic causing a three-month long lockdown across Luzon and the non-renewal of the ABS-CBN franchise, the shows were postponed for a few months, eventually being abolished due to the circumstances. As a result, all of the remaining contestants advanced to the prerecorded finale.

=== Finale (August 15 & 16) ===
Due to the travel restrictions, the artists and the coaches had to record their performances at their homes, following the instructions of the technical staff. The finale was taped on the first week of August 2020.

The winners of each team were determined by the four coaches themselves since the finale was prerecorded, featuring no interactive viewer voting component, and therefore, no results shows.

Each team performed as a group with their coach. Afterwards, each coach was given 100 points to divide among the three artists. Half of the artist's score was composed of the score given by their coach while the other half was composed of the scores given by the other coaches. The artists with the highest score in their respective teams were named the winners.

With her victory as one of the grand champions of the season, Heart Salvador of Kamp Kawayan, who was a semifinalist on the same team in the third season of The Voice Kids became the first comeback artist to become a grand champion in the entire Philippine franchise of The Voice. Coincidentally, Rock Opong became the third consecutive comeback artist to place third after Justin Alva and Cyd Pangca in the third and fourth seasons of The Voice Kids respectively.

Furthermore, Cydel Gabutero's victory as one of the grand champions of the season marked the third victory of Lea Salonga as a coach on all editions of the Philippine franchise of The Voice, a feat which was first achieved by Sarah Geronimo, made her the second coach in all franchises of the Voice around the world that managed artists in three different versions of The Voice (with Mitoy Yonting winning the first season of The Voice of the Philippines and Joshua Oliveros winning the third season of the Philippine version of The Voice Kids).

Additionally, Kendra Aguirre and Isang Manlapaz respective victories as grand champions of the season marked the third consecutive and fifth overall victory of Sarah Geronimo and the first victory of apl.de.ap as coaches in the entire Philippine franchise of The Voice.

Lastly, this was the final season of Salonga and Geronimo as coaches in the entire Philippine franchise of The Voice after serving as a coach for 8 and 7 seasons respectively.

Color key:

Artist received the highest total score and was declared as the team winner

Episode	Coach	Order	Artist	Song	Scores					Result
Episode	Coach	Order	Artist	Song	apl.de.ap	Lea	Sarah	Bamboo	Total	Result
Episode 31 (August 15, 2020)	Bamboo Mañalac	1	Heart Salvador	"Ain't No Sunshine"	40	45	40	40	40.83	Winner
Episode 31 (August 15, 2020)	Bamboo Mañalac	1	Kate Campo	"Ain't No Sunshine"	25	25	25	35	30.00	Runner-up
Episode 31 (August 15, 2020)	Bamboo Mañalac	1	Rock Opong	"Ain't No Sunshine"	35	30	35	25	29.17	Third place
Episode 31 (August 15, 2020)	Lea Salonga	2	Alexia Tag-at	"Lean on Me"	35	30	30	35	31.67	Runner-up
Episode 31 (August 15, 2020)	Lea Salonga	2	Cydel Gabutero	"Lean on Me"	45	50	50	45	48.33	Winner
Episode 31 (August 15, 2020)	Lea Salonga	2	Kristian Rajagopal	"Lean on Me"	20	20	20	20	20.00	Third place
Episode 32 (August 16, 2020)	apl.de.ap	3	Calvin Candelaria	"Labo"	20	25	25	10	20.00	Third place
Episode 32 (August 16, 2020)	apl.de.ap	3	Yang-Yang Aloya	"Labo"	30	25	40	50	34.17	Runner-up
Episode 32 (August 16, 2020)	apl.de.ap	3	Isang Manlapaz	"Labo"	50	50	35	40	45.83	Winner
Episode 32 (August 16, 2020)	Sarah Geronimo	4	Jaylloyd Garche	"Kung 'Di Rin Lang Ikaw"	40	45	30	25	33.33	Runner-up
Episode 32 (August 16, 2020)	Sarah Geronimo	4	Kendra Aguirre	"Kung 'Di Rin Lang Ikaw"	45	30	50	40	44.17	Winner
Episode 32 (August 16, 2020)	Sarah Geronimo	4	Andre Parker	"Kung 'Di Rin Lang Ikaw"	15	25	20	35	22.50	Third place

== Television ratings ==
Television ratings for the second season of The Voice Teens on ABS-CBN were gathered from Kantar Media, where its survey ratings are gathered from urban and rural households all over the Philippines.

Episode		Original airdate	Timeslot (PST)	Rating	Timeslot	Primetime	Source
1	"The Blind auditions premiere"	February 8, 2020	Saturday 7:30 p.m.	28.9%	#1	#1	
2	"The Blind auditions – part 2"	February 9, 2020	Sunday 8:15 p.m.	23.9%	#2	#3	
3	"The Blind auditions – part 3"	February 15, 2020	Saturday 7:30 p.m.	28.5%	#1	#1	
4	"The Blind auditions – part 4"	February 16, 2020	Sunday 8:15 p.m.	28.9%	#1	#2	
5	"The Blind auditions – part 5"	February 22, 2020	Saturday 7:30 p.m.	27.6%	#1	#1	
6	"The Blind auditions – part 6"	February 23, 2020	Sunday 8:45 p.m.	20.2%	#2	#3	
7	"The Blind auditions – part 7"	February 29, 2020	Saturday 7:30 p.m.	27.5%	#1	#1	
8	"The Blind auditions – part 8"	March 1, 2020	Sunday 8:15 p.m.	25.5%	#2	#3	
9	"The Blind auditions – part 9"	March 7, 2020	Saturday 7:30 p.m.	28.1%	#1	#1	
10	"The Blind auditions – part 10"	March 8, 2020	Sunday 8:15 p.m.	24.1%	#2	#2	
11	"The Blind auditions – part 11"	March 14, 2020	Saturday 7:30 p.m.				
12	"The Blind auditions – part 12"	March 15, 2020	Sunday 8:15 p.m.				
13	"The Blind auditions – part 13"	June 13, 2020	Saturday 7:30 p.m.				
14	"The Blind auditions – part 14"	June 14, 2020	Sunday 7:15 p.m.				
15	"The Blind auditions – part 15"	June 20, 2020	Saturday 7:30 p.m.				
16	"The Blind auditions – part 16"	June 21, 2020	Sunday 7:15 p.m.				
17	"The Battles – part 1"	June 27, 2020	Saturday 7:30 p.m.				
18	"The Battles – part 2"	June 28, 2020	Sunday 7:15 p.m.				
