= Jsu Garcia =

American actor

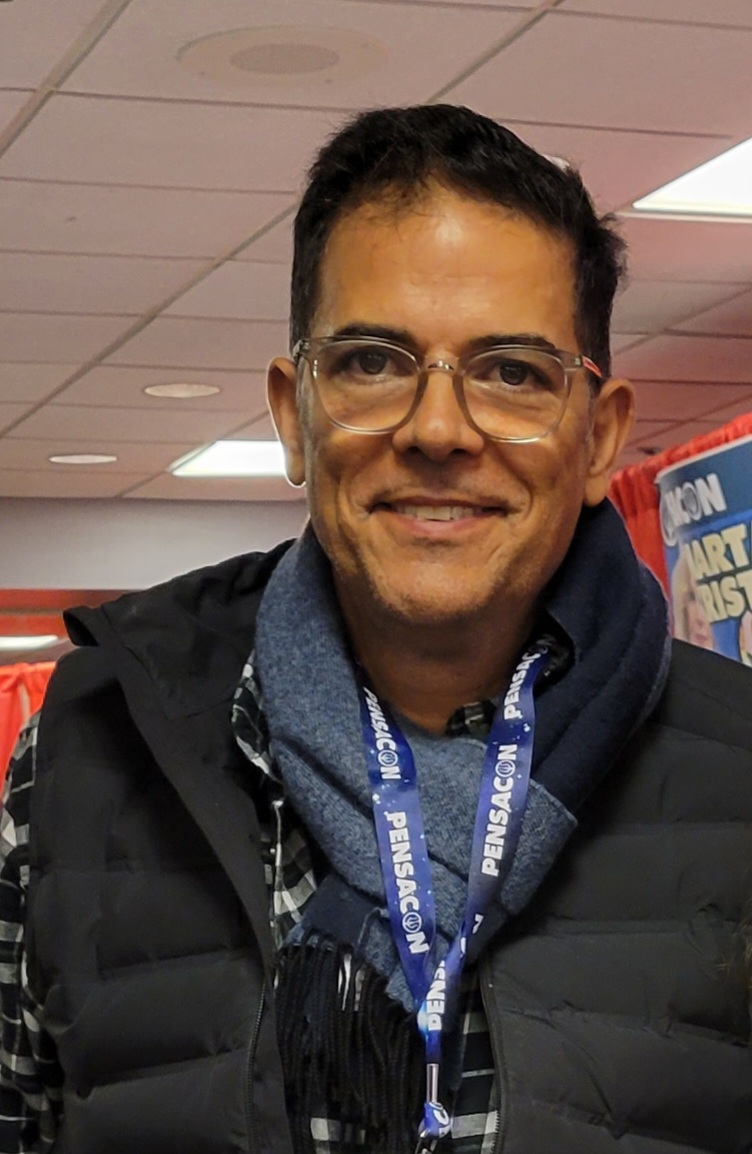
- Garcia in February 2022
- Born: Jesus Garcia; October 6, 1963 (age 62); New York City, New York, U.S.
- Other names: Nick Corri, Thom Fox
- Occupations: Actor; director; minister
- Years active: 1982–present

Jesus "Jsu" Garcia (/dʒeɪˈzuː/), also credited as Nick Corri (born October 6, 1963), is an American film and television actor and producer. Together with author John-Roger, he runs the production company Scott J-R Productions.

== Early life ==
Garcia was born in New York City as Jesus Garcia, to Cuban immigrant parents. He attended Fairfax High School where he studied acting.

== Career ==
His first role was on the TV show Fame (1982), where he used the stage name Thom Fox. He then appeared in his first film Wes Craven's A Nightmare on Elm Street (1984). This was followed by an appearance in Universal's Gotcha! (1985), and then in features such as Wildcats (1986), Slaves of New York (1989), Tropical Snow (1989), Vampire in Brooklyn (1995), and Traffic (2000). In 2002 Garcia was in Randall Wallace's We Were Soldiers (2002) in which he portrays Mel Gibson's heroic friend, the commander of a company fighting against the Viet Cong; and in Andrew Davis' Collateral Damage (2002), in which he plays a villainous Communist guerrilla who battles Arnold Schwarzenegger's character. In addition to appearances on TV shows, including JAG (1995), Arli$$ (1996), The Facts of Life, Miami Vice, Babylon 5, She Spies, Crossing Jordan and Murder One (1995), Garcia also played the male lead in an ABC / Touchstone pilot, Then Came Jones, and had a recurring role on Without a Trace (2007). Garcia also played a supporting role in Along Came Polly (2004). Garcia played revolutionary Che Guevara in Andy García's The Lost City. He took part in the 2010 documentary film Never Sleep Again: The Elm Street Legacy discussing his roles in various films in the Elm Street franchise. Garcia portrayed Francisco d'Anconia in Atlas Shrugged: Part 1 (2011), based on Ayn Rand's novel of the same name.

Garcia has also acted in theater including a production of Grease and won a Drama-Logue Award for his performance in the play Short Eyes.

== Personal life ==
Garcia is an ordained minister in the Movement of Spiritual Inner Awareness, founded by John-Roger.

== Filmography ==
=== Film ===
Year	Title	Role	Notes
1982	The Silence	Soldier	Short film
1984	A Nightmare on Elm Street	Rod Lane	Credited as Nick Corri
1985	Gotcha!	Manolo	Credited as Nick Corri
1986	Wildcats	Cerulo	Credited as Nick Corri
1988	Tropical Snow	Gustavo "Tavo" Luna	
1988	The Lawless Land	Falco	
1989	Slaves of New York	Marley	
1990	Predator 2	Detective Dvorkin	
1992	In the Heat of Passion	Charlie Bronson	
1994	Wes Craven's New Nightmare	Himself	Credited as Nick Corri
1995	Vampire in Brooklyn	Anthony	
1996	Red Shoe Diaries 13: Four on the Floor	Miguel	Segment: "Four on the Floor"
1997	Strategic Command	Captain Rattner	
1998	Woo	Maitre d'	
1998	My Little Havana	Jesu Matamoro	Short film
1999	Candyman: Day of the Dead	David De La Paz	Direct-to-video
1999	Window	New Patient	Short film
2000	Teacher's Pet	Sam Deckner	
2000	Traffic	Pablo Obregón	
2001	The Quickie	Miguel	
2002	L.A.X.	Jorge Colon	
2002	Collateral Damage	Roman	
2002	We Were Soldiers	Captain Tony Nadal	
2003	Klepto	Nick	Video
2004	Along Came Polly	Javier	
2004	After the Past		
2004	Back by Midnight	Carlos	
2005	Sueño	Rafael	
2005	The Lost City	Ernesto "Che" Guevarra	
2007	The Go-Getter	Arlen	
2007	Spiritual Warriors	Christopher Finn	
2008	Me and My Daddy	Dad	Short film
2008	Che: Part One	Jorge Sotús	
2008	Shattered!	Jimmy	
2008	Blind	The Boss	Short film
2009	Who You Are	Finn	Short film
2010	Dante's Inferno: Abandon All Hope	Speaker: 7th Circle - The Blasphemers	Short film
2010	Once Fallen	Benny	
2010	Undocumented	El Torro	
2011	The Wayshower	Jesus	
2011	Atlas Shrugged: Part I	Francisco D'Anconia	
2016	Miracle Underground		
2016	Inferno by Dante	Speaker - 7th Circle: Capaneus and Latini	

=== Television ===
Year	Title	Role	Notes
1985	Generation	'Scrad'	Television movie
1986	American Playhouse	Javier Iglesia	Episode: "The House of Ramon Iglesia"
1986	The Facts of Life	Enrico Quinterez	Episode: "The Wedding Day"
1986-1988	Miami Vice	Colon / Officer Ramirez	Episodes: "Badge of Dishonor", "The Good Collar"
1987	The Bronx Zoo	Mario Dagostine	Episode: "Changes"
1994	Red Shoe Diaries	Miguel	Episode: "Four on the Floor"
1994-1996	Murder, She Wrote	Alex Lebron / Manuel Ramirez	Episodes: "Proof in the Pudding", "Death Goes Double Platinum"
1995	Babylon 5	Lieutenant Ramirez	Episode: "All Alone in the Night"
1996	Murder One	Eduardo Portalegre	Episodes: "Chapter Eleven", "Chapter Seventeen", "Chapter Twenty"
1996	Arliss	Robo	Episode: "A Man of Our Times"
1996	Dave's World	Juan	Episodes: "Crime and Coconuts", "Miami Beached"
1996	Women: Stories of Passion	Eddie	Episode: "Blind Love"
1997	Crisis Center	Arturo Garcia	Episode: "Someone to Watch Over Me"
1998	JAG	Branko Mendoza	Episode: "Yesterday's Heroes"
1998–1999	The Net	Mariano Maza	Episodes: "Zero", "Go Like You Know"
2000	Secret Agent Man	Vargas	Episodes: "From Prima with Love", "Like Father, Like Monk"
2000	Rocky Times		Television movie
2002	She Spies	Antonio Ronoso	Episode: "Three Women and a Baby"
2003	These Guys	Rick	Television movie
2003	Then Came Jones		Television movie
2004	Crossing Jordan	Detective Martin Cruz	Episodes: "Dead or Alive", "Most Likely"
2005	Love, Inc.	Antonio	Episode: "Three's Company"
2006	CSI: Miami	Cesar 'Cuzz' Morales	Episode: "Fade Out"
2006	Our House	Officer Gibbs	Television movie
2007	Without a Trace	Carlos Aguilar	4 episodes
2011	CSI: NY	Hector Vargas	Episode: "Holding Cell"
2015	All I Want for Christmas	Doug Matthews	Television movie
