= Gamín =

1981 film

- Gamín film promotional poster
- Directed by: Ciro Durán
- Written by: Ciro Durán
- Produced by: Joyce Ventura
- Starring: Carlos Muñoz (narrator)
- Music by: Francisco Zumaque
- Production companies: Producciones Cinematográficas Uno; Instituto Nacional Audiovisual – INA
- Release date: 1977
- Running time: 110 min.
- Countries: Colombia; France
- Language: Spanish

Gamín (English: street urchin) is a 1977 Colombian documentary film written and directed by Ciro Durán.

== Plot ==
Narrated by Carlos Muñoz, Gamín is a documentary on the life of street children, called Gamín in Colombia, in Bogotá who have broken all family ties and struggle to survive on the streets of the city. The film illustrates, with shocking images, the homelessness and awful living conditions of these surviving children who are seen sleeping on the streets of Bogotá, stealing food, car radios, selling cardboard, begging, etc..
