= Anthony Tan =

Singaporean businessman

Anthony Tan Ping Yeow
- 陈炳耀
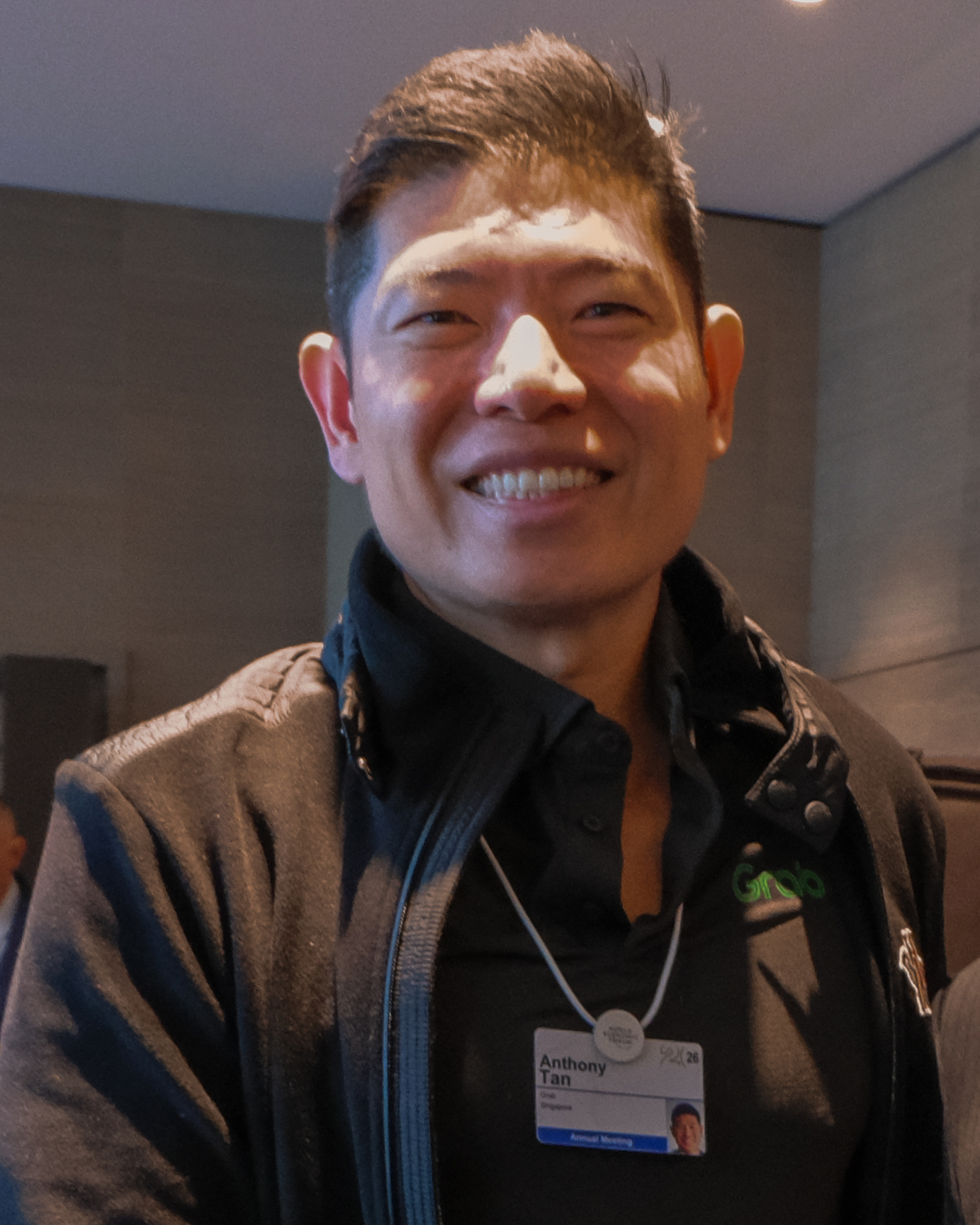
- Tan in 2026
- Born: 1982 (age 43–44); Kuala Lumpur, Malaysia
- Citizenship: Singaporean
- Education: University of Chicago (BA); Harvard Business School (M.B.A.)
- Occupation: Businessman
- Known for: Co-founder and CEO of Grab
- Spouse: Chloe Tong
- Children: 5
- Parents: Tan Heng Chew (father); Rosie Tan (mother)

Anthony Tan Ping Yeow (Chinese: 陈炳耀; born 1982) is a Singaporean businessman. He is the co-founder and chief executive officer of Grab, a publicly traded technology company and the first unicorn in Southeast Asia. In 2021, he was listed as one of Singapore's richest people with an estimated net worth of $790 million according to Forbes.

== Early life and education ==
Tan was born in Kuala Lumpur, Malaysia. His father, Tan Heng Chew is an automobile manufacturing executive who served as the president of Tan Chong Motor, a Malaysian manufacturing company that assembles and distributes Nissan vehicles in the Southeast Asia region. Tan's great-grandfather was a taxi driver and his grandfather introduced the Japanese automotive industry in Malaysia. He worked on the assembly line at his father's company and attended meetings with union bosses at a young age.

Tan expressed an interest in business and entrepreneurship at a young age. He started his first business venture at the age of 11 when he began retail trading and accepting cash for X-Men comics. At the age of 14, he volunteered to raise money for the AIDS Foundation.

As an undergraduate, Tan attended the University of Chicago and earned a bachelor's degree in economics and public policy. He later earned a Master's of Business Administration from Harvard Business School.

== Career ==
Tan was the head of supply chain and marketing at Tan Chong Group for the automotive brands under the Tan Chong Motor conglomerate. He chose not to work for the family business and started to develop an idea for a company after a friend from Harvard visited Malaysia and complained to him about the country's taxi system.

While attending Harvard Business School, Tan partnered with his classmate Tan Hooi Ling on making taxis safer in their home country of Malaysia in part due to ranking as the worst cab service in the world. They wrote a business plan for a taxi booking app, which won the second prize at the HBS New Venture Competition in 2011. Using the $25,000 of prize money from the competition, their own personal funds and an investment from Tan's mother, the duo launched MyTeksi in June 2012 with its headquarters in the country's capital.

By 2016, the company, with investment from the Singaporean state-owned investment firm Temasek Holdings, relocated to Singapore and rebranded as Grab. He was a speaker at the World Economic Forum in 2019.

Along with more than 40 other executives, Tan was a founding member of AI for Good Global Commission which works to reduce inequality and strengthen trust in the technology for developing nations.

== Personal life ==
Concurrent to the company move to Singapore, Tan took up Singapore citizenship in 2016.

Tan is married to Chloe Tong, daughter of Tong Kooi Ong. They have five children.

In November 2023, Grab faced boycotts in Indonesia and Malaysia after an Instagram story post by Chloe Tong, Tan's wife, resurfaced. In the story, posted during a religious heritage family trip to Israel in July, Chloe expressed being "completely in love" with the country. The post gained attention amid the Gaza war, which began in October.
