= Tropical Snow =

1989 film

- Promotional poster
- Directed by: Ciro Durán
- Written by: Ciro Durán
- Produced by: J.D. Leif
- Starring: David Carradine; Madeleine Stowe; Jsu Garcia
- Cinematography: Eduardo Serra
- Edited by: Duncan Burns
- Music by: Alan DerMarderosian
- Distributed by: Paramount Pictures
- Release dates: 1988 (West Germany); April 1989 (US)
- Running time: 87 minutes
- Country: United States
- Language: English

Tropical Snow is a 1988 American drama film written and directed by Ciro Durán and starring David Carradine, Madeleine Stowe, and Jsu Garcia (credited as "Nick Corri"). It was Durán's "first scripted, English-language feature", and also Tim Allen's film debut (with a cameo as a baggage handler).

== Plot ==
Tavo and Marina Luna live in poverty in Bogotá and desire a better life in New York. Such a move is an expense neither can afford. Tavo is almost killed while attempting to pickpocket, and Marina refuses to enter a life of prostitution. She was working in a gentlemen's lounge but leaves after Tavo becomes jealous.

Oskar, a local drug peddler offers them the chance to move to the United States if they agree to smuggle cocaine into John F. Kennedy International. Tavo eventually dies from a drug overdose after failing to pass the cocaine. Marina survives, passing the cocaine in custody before spending time in a United States prison and then returning to Colombia.

== Cast ==
- David Carradine as Oskar
- Madeleine Stowe as Marina Luna
- Jsu Garcia as Gustavo "Tavo" Luna
- Argemiro Castiblanco as Horse Trader
- Alfonso Ortiz as Pickpocket Teacher
- Celmira Yepes as Matilde
- Evelyn Osorio as Teacher's assistant
- Libia Tenorio as Tavo's mother
- Merena Demont as Marina's mother
- Roger Melo as Tavo's step-father

== Reception ==
Tropical Snow was described by Bill Kelley of the Sun Sentinel as "that bleakest of low-budget entities – an exploitation B-movie with a social conscience". Kelley criticized the direction and acting, stating both were done with the "sort of solemn incompetence that only the truly untalented can achieve", noting that even the explicit love scenes had a "sad, desperate quality". While praising Carradine's performance, he described the remaining cast as "unconvincing" and concluded by calling the film "boring".

In rating the film one star out of five, Michael Mills of the Palm Beach Post stated that "despite its poetic title, Tropical Snow is glum and prosaic". The same review did praise the film's cinematography, observing it "gives everything, even the hillside shanty towns, a tarnished glow". The movie was noted as "timely" given the attempts by Colombia to pursue drug lords at the time the film was made.

Juan Coto of the Miami Herald gave the film two and a half stars out of five, praising the "strong" performances by Garcia and Stowe. The performance of Carradine was also praised, with Coto opining it was "surprisingly genteel" and "perhaps the kindest drug dealer ever put on screen". He finalized the review as "topical" but "sometimes as simplistic as the metaphor in [the] title". Critic Steven Puchalski also sees Tropical Snow as a "gritty potboiler": "Maintaining a serious tone throughout, [Durán] captures the poverty and despair of his [Colombian] home turf, while demonstrating how prostitution, crime and drugs could seem like the only way to succeed". The film still made concession to commercialism, as with "scattered moments of overheated drama and lots of gratuitous nudity from both Stowe and Corri".
