= Aquileo Venganza =

1968 film

- Directed by: Ciro Durán
- Starring: Carlos Muñoz; Camilo Medina; Rey Vásquez; Orlando Galas; Bertha Matijasevich
- Release date: 1968
- Countries: Colombia; Venezuela
- Language: Spanish

Aquileo Venganza (lit. 'Aquileo Vengeance') is a 1968 film directed by Ciro Durán and produced between Colombia and Venezuela. Released on 22 October 1968, it starred Carlos Muñoz, Camilo Medina, Rey Vásquez, Orlando Galas and Bertha Matijasevich.

== Plot ==
In the 1920s, the Thousand Days' War ravaged the Colombian countryside. The owners of small plots of land are threatened by bandits who steal their resources. Aquileo, victim of this scourge, decides to take revenge and confront these criminals alone.

== Cast ==
- Carlos Muñoz
- Camilo Medina
- Rey Vásquez
- Orlando Galas
- Bertha Matijasevich
