= Jekkloy =

Filipino rapper

Angelo Acosta
- Also known as: Jekkloy
- Born: Angelo Acosta; December 15, 2003 (age 22); Quezon City, Philippines
- Origin: Navotas, Philippines
- Genre: hip hop
- Occupations: rapper; singer; songwriter; record producer
- Instrument: Vocals
- Years active: 2017–present
- Labels: Curve Entertainment (2020-2022)

Angelo Acosta (born December 15, 2003), who records under his stage name Jekkloy, is a Filipino rapper, singer-songwriter, and television personality.

== Early and personal life ==
Acosta was born on December 15, 2003, in Quezon City, Philippines. He has an older sibling; their father, who was a cop in Manila was shot and killed on duty when they were kids and their mother had to raise them on her own. At age 11, he began writing songs and participating in rap battles.

== Career ==
In 2020, Acosta participated in the blind auditions of the second season of The Voice Teens & sang Shanti Dope's hit "Nadarang", he got two-chair turns with Bamboo and apl.de.ap turning. He picked the latter as his coach. He made history as the first hip-hop artist across all eight seasons of The Voice of the Philippines. He was eliminated in the Battles.

In 2022, his track "Don't Mess With My Christmas" was selected by Randy Jackson, Mike Posner and Joel Madden as the runner-up among thousands of entries in the international songwriting competition, "MerryModz $100K XMas Song Contest".

== Influences ==
On a radio interview, Acosta said that he "grew up listening" to Bruno Mars and apl.de.ap of the Black Eyed Peas as an eight-year-old before discovering Frank Ocean, Daniel Caesar and Mac Miller. Other artists Acosta has said that inspired his work include Kendrick Lamar, J Cole, Drake.

== Filmography ==
=== Film ===
| Year | Film | Role | Film Production | Notes |
|---|---|---|---|---|
| 2019 | Finding You | Friend of Nel & Grace (Credited) | Regal Films | First film appearance (also on Netflix) |

=== Television ===
| Year | Title | Network | Role | Notes |
|---|---|---|---|---|
| 2017; 2019 | It's Showtime | ABS-CBN | Contestant (Sinong Nanay Mo?, Mr. Q&A) | Episode: "January 19, 2017"; Episode: "October 10, 2019" |
| 2018 | Since I Found You | ABS-CBN | Adrian | Special participation |
| 2018 | Magandang Buhay | ABS-CBN | Himself | Episode: July 3, 2018 |
| 2018 | Kadenang Ginto | ABS-CBN | Ser | Appeared on three episodes |
| 2018 | Imbestigador | GMA Network | Roy | Episode: "July 21, 2018"; First lead role |
| 2019 | iJuander | GMA Network | Himself | Episode: February 3, 2019 |
| 2019 | Wish Ko Lang! | GMA Network | JM | Episode: "November 3, 2019" |
| 2020 | The Voice Teens | ABS-CBN | Teen Artist | Under Team APL |
| 2021, 2024 | It's Showtime | Kapamilya Channel | Himself | Episode: "September 23, 2021"; Episode: "May 22, 2024" (EXpecially for You) |

=== As commercial model ===
| Year | Brand | Product/ Promo |
|---|---|---|
| 2018 | Grab | GrabFood |
