= Ciro Durán =

Colombian screenwriter and film director (1937–2022)

- Born: 16 December 1937; Convención, Colombia
- Died: 10 January 2022 (aged 84); Tobia, Colombia
- Occupations: Screenwriter; Film director

Ciro Durán (16 December 1937 – 10 January 2022) was a Colombian screenwriter and film director. He died in Tobia on 10 January 2022, at the age of 84.

== Filmography ==
- La paga (1962)
- Aquileo Venganza (1968)
- Corralejas de Sincelejo (1976)
- Tayrona. Codirigido con Joyce Ventura (1977)
- Gamín (1977)
- Niños de dos mundos (1979)
- Las cuatro edades del amor (1980)
- La guerra del centavo (1985)
- Tropical Snow (1988)
- Comment vont les enfants (1990)
- La nave de los sueños (1996)
- La toma de la embajada (2000)

== Awards ==
- Best New Director at the San Sebastián International Film Festival (1979)
