= Taxis of Vietnam =

Taxis in Vietnam are part of a complex transportation and economic system within the country. Taxicabs are one facet of a diverse 'vehicle for hire' ecosystem in Vietnam.

== History ==
=== 1880-1940: Introduction of Vehicles for Hire ===
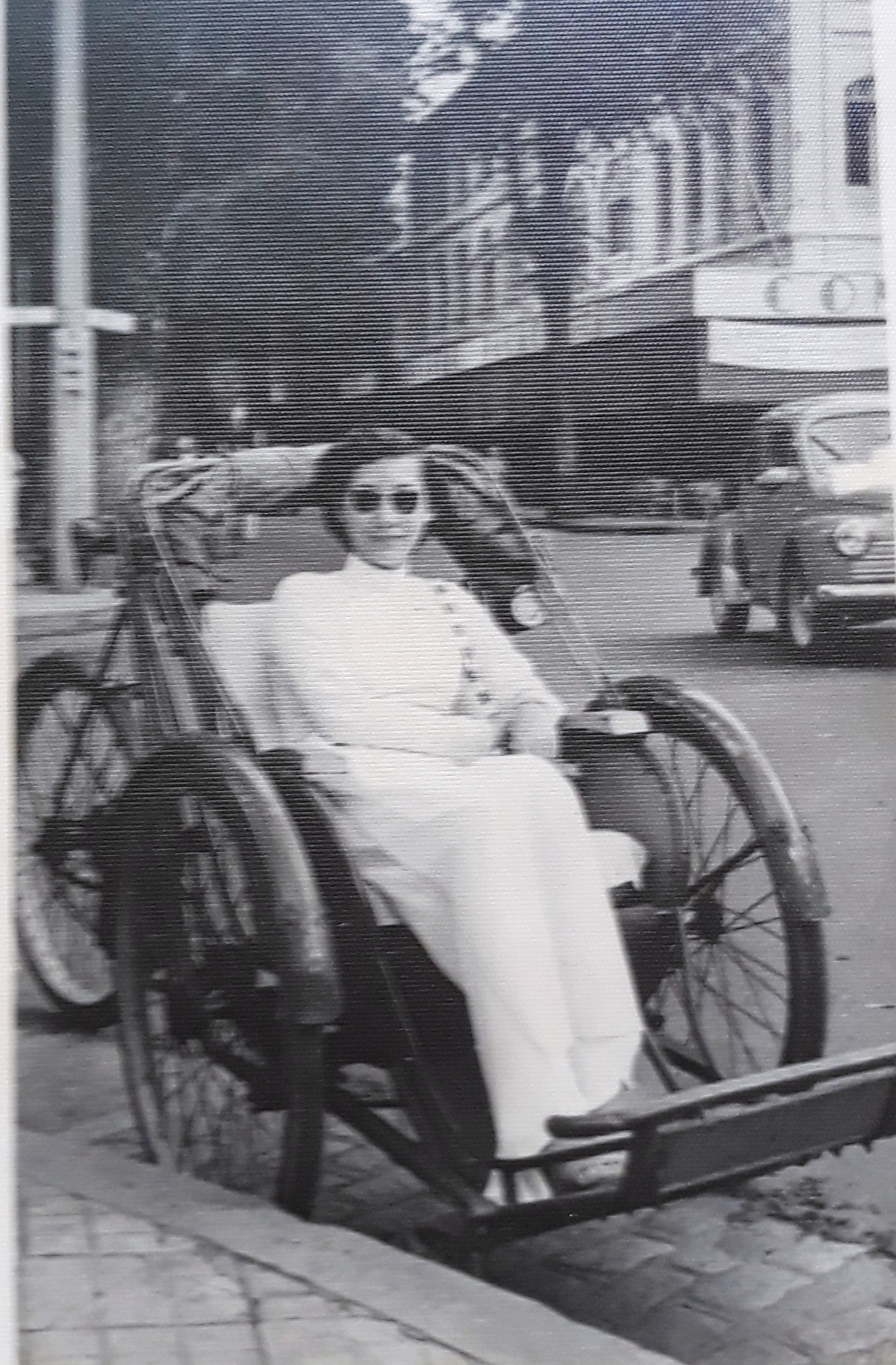
Xích lô

H. Hazel Hanh, in their 2013 "Journal of Vietnam Studies" article, described the introduction of the rickshaw (xe-kéo, or "pulling vehicle") from Japan to Vietnam in 1883. In its early years, its main customer base was among European colonizers within then-French Indochina, with a small number of French firms holding a quasi-monopoly on both manufacturing and circulation. After the proliferation of public cycle rickshaws (xích lô, from cyclo) and rampant rickshaw taxes forced reform and regulation in the 1910s, Vietnamese residents became a more significant portion of the customer base and began to regularly use the vehicle-for-hire service for daily urban life.

=== 1950-1990: Xe ôm and Xe Lam ===
With an increasing presence of American citizens and their imported motorbikes in the 1960s, the demand rose for motorbikes comfortable enough for two, especially Italian and Japanese models. The increasing availability of these vehicles and the demand for more nimble vehicles for hire led to the Xe ôm motorcycle taxi services ('hug car, referring to the passenger holding onto the driver).

In the late 1970s, the auto rickshaw became more popular as a vehicle for hire to transport customers and goods, including the xe lam (also known as "Lambro" from the original manufacturer's name, a three-wheeler with the driver at the front), the xe loi (a motorbike with an open trailer attached), and the xe ba gác (lit. 'motor tricycle'; a three-wheeler with the driver at the back). However, the vehicles and their drivers were heavily regulated at the turn of the century with the vehicles becoming outright banned by 2008.

=== 1990-Present: The Rise of Four Wheels ===
In an effort towards localization of auto manufacturing in the 1990s, a slew of joint ventures with foreign manufacturers allowed for the modern assembly of four-wheel automobiles in Vietnam, significantly lowering the dependency on imports and subsequently lowering the prices of cars. With significant infrastructure development in the 2000s, motorbikes being banned from expressways, and the xích lô becoming banned from most streets of Vietnam's major cities, taxicab services became viable. Air-conditioned, metered taxicabs were a contrast to the lower priced, but informal services offered by the xe om motorbike and the xích lô rickshaw taxi drivers, and the burgeoning middle class of Vietnam was looking to use its disposable income While riding a taxi was once an elusive status symbol for many, car ownership has become an increasingly attainable status symbol for others.

With Urban Rail Transit projects being continuously delayed in the cities, residents continue to access an array of transportation options, including buses, private vehicles, taxicabs, motorbike taxis

== Economy ==
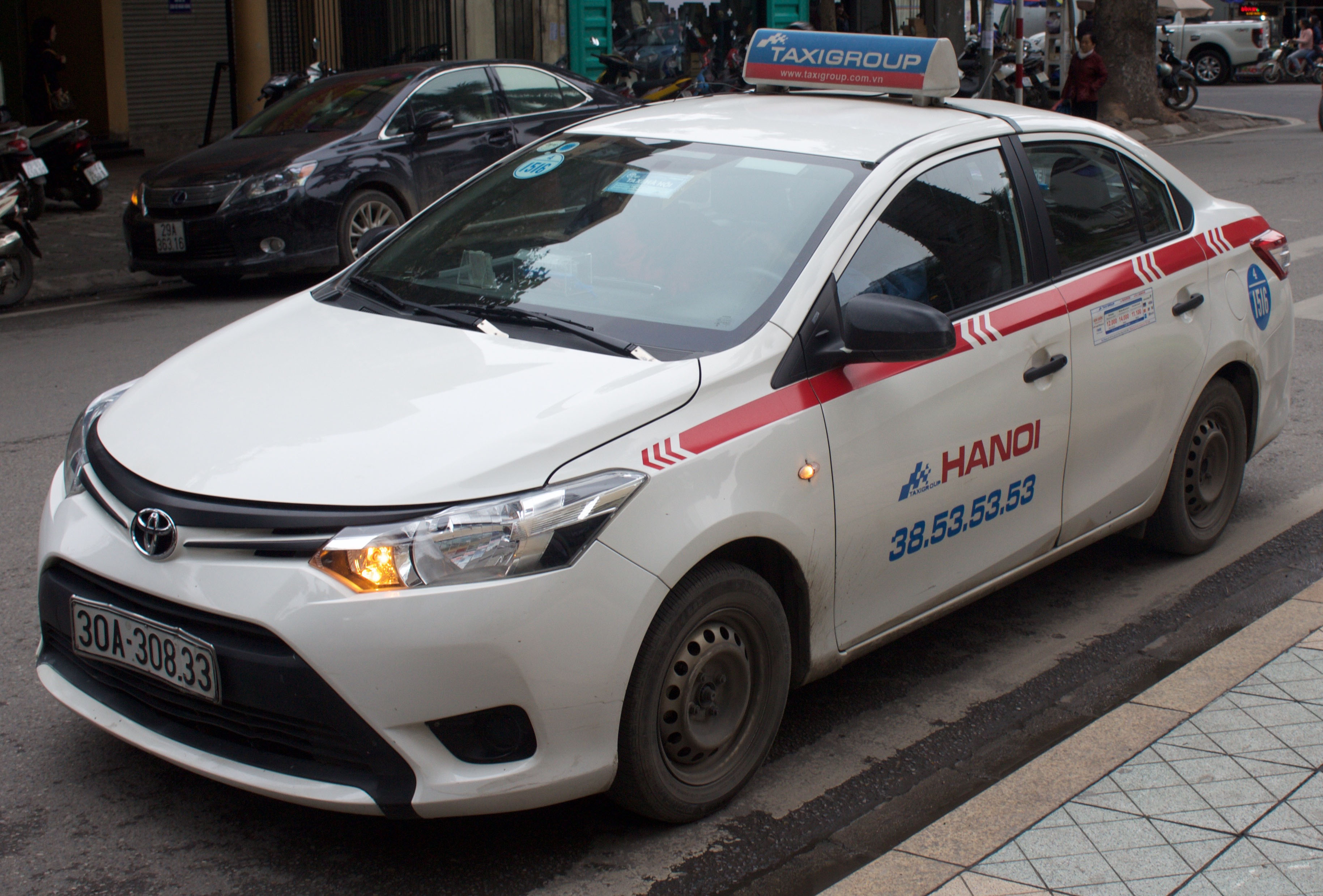
Toyota Limo in Hanoi, a model designed for taxicab use in Southeast Asian markets

=== Market share ===
Taxicab companies and independent cab drivers operate side by side. Mailinh, Hanoi, and Vinasun are among the biggest taxi companies. FastGo is Vietnam's first car-hailing app, though it is joined by Mailinh's native app, Grab (which took over Uber's operations after the company's exit from the region in 2018) among a growing number of apps.

In Hanoi alone, it was calculated in 2018 that there were 26,350 taxicabs in collectively accounting for 14% of the rides taken (with buses accounting for 8.5% and private cars for 8%).

App-based motorcycle taxi services have also become available, but have not proven to stabilize the financial position of the drivers.

=== Price and regulation ===
Taxi companies that refuse to adjust fares to market circumstances, such as drops in the price of fuel, have been cautioned with fined by authorities. In 2019, Vietnam was listed as one of ten countries with the cheapest taxi fares.

Vinasun and Grabcar have been involved in legal disputes on whether ride sharing apps should be regulated as taxi companies as well as technology companies. In 2020, a policy was announced that cars providing paid rides, regardless if app-based or not, would have to switched to yellow license plate to declare their status as a 'commissioned' car.

== In popular culture ==
In media, taxi driver characters have been used to capture Vietnam's cultural changes, often as a remark on economic disparities between rider and driver. In the 1995 film Cyclo, Lê Văn Lộc stars as the cyclo rickshaw driver protagonist. In the 1999 film Three Seasons stars Don Duong as the cyclo rickshaw driver protagonist. The 2004 song Taxi by Vietnamese pop group H.A.T. includes them singing to a taxi driver. The 2009 film Adrift includes Nguyen Duy Khoa as a taxi driver main character. The 2016 film Taxi, What's Your Name stars Angela Phuong Trinh as the taxicab driver protagonist and Truong Giang as her passenger.
