= Grab Holdings =

Singaporean technology company

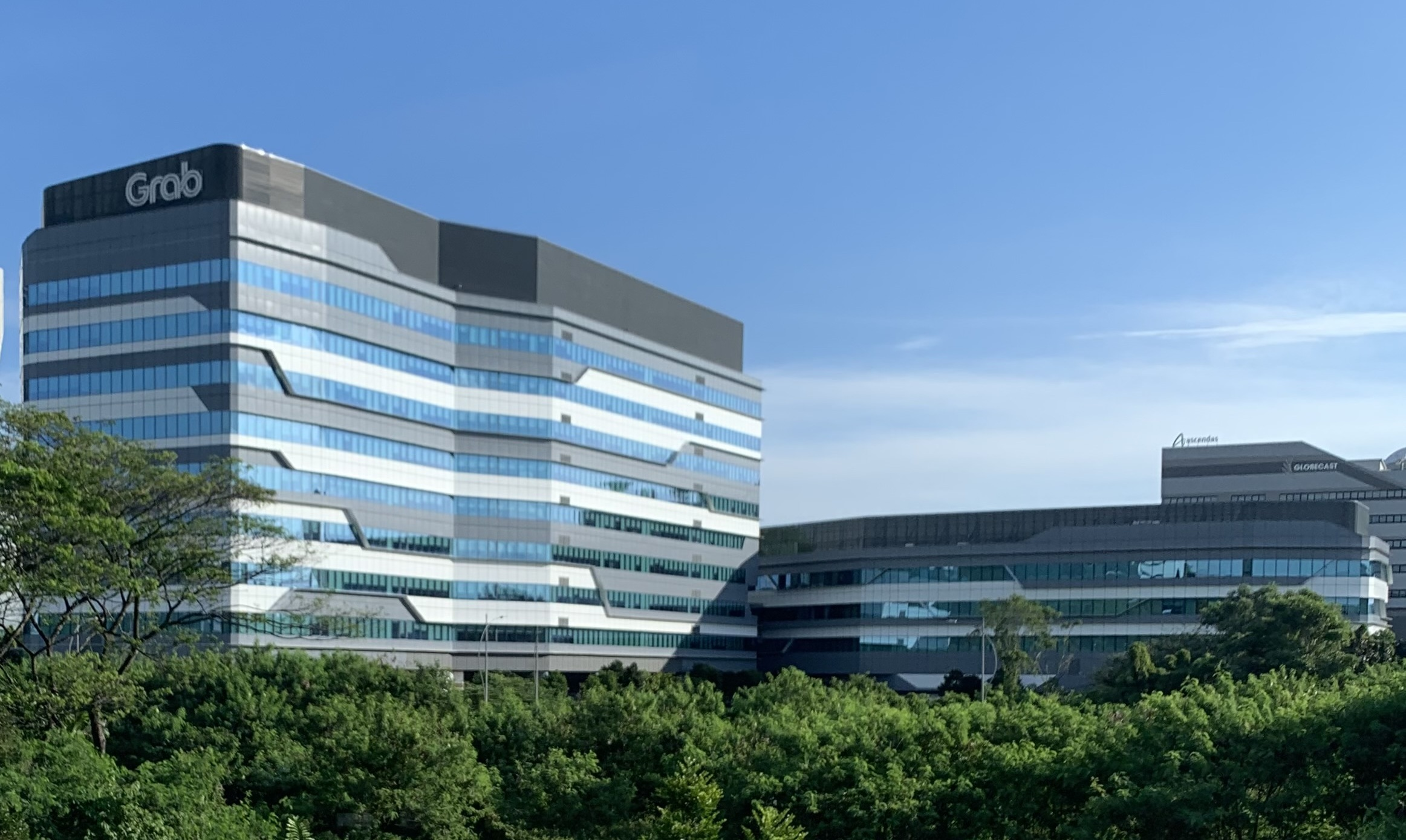
- Grab headquarters at one-north, Singapore
- Formerly: MyTeksi (2011–2013); GrabTaxi (2013–2016)
- Type: Public
- Traded as: Nasdaq: GRAB (Class A)
- ISIN: KYG4124C1096
- Industry: Technology; Transportation; Food service; E-commerce; Financial services
- Founded: June 2012; 14 years ago (as MyTeksi) in Kuala Lumpur, Malaysia
- Founders: Anthony Tan; Tan Hooi Ling
- Headquarters: 3 Media Close, one-north, Singapore
- Area served: Singapore; Malaysia; Cambodia; Indonesia; Myanmar; Philippines; Thailand; Vietnam
- Key people: Anthony Tan (Chairman and CEO); Alex Hungate (President and COO)
- Products: Mobile app
- Services: Transportation; Ride-sharing & Ride-hailing; Vehicle rental; Food delivery; Grocery delivery; Parcel delivery; E-commerce platform; Online payment; Insurance
- Revenue: ▲US$2.80 billion (FY2024)
- Operating income: ▲US$−168 million (FY2024)
- Net income: ▲US$−158 million (FY2024)
- Total assets: US$9.30 billion (FY2024)
- Total equity: US$6.35 billion (FY2024)
- Number of employees: 11,000 (2025)
- Subsidiaries: Jaya Grocer; HungryGoWhere; Chope; OVO
- Website: grab.com
- Footnotes: Financials as of December 31, 2024; No. of employees as of December 31, 2025; HQ location; Subsidiaries

Grab Holdings Inc. is a Singaporean multinational technology company headquartered in one-north, Singapore. It is the developer of a super-app for ride-hailing, food delivery, and digital payment services on mobile devices. It operates in Singapore, Malaysia, Cambodia, Indonesia, Myanmar, the Philippines, Thailand, and Vietnam.

The company was founded as MyTeksi by Anthony Tan and Tan Hooi Ling in 2012 to make taxi rides safer in Malaysia. By 2016, it was rebranded as Grab with an expansion of partnerships in Southeast Asia that coincided with the development of products for couriers.

Grab is Southeast Asia's first decacorn and the biggest technology startup in the region. It became publicly traded on the NASDAQ in 2021, following the largest SPAC merger at the time. In 2023, Fast Company listed Grab amongst the most innovative companies in the Asia-Pacific region.

== History ==
=== Founding and growth ===
The idea of creating a taxi-booking mobile app for Southeast Asia came from Anthony Tan (Chinese: 陈炳耀; Pe̍h-ōe-jī: Tân Péng-iāu; pinyin: Chén Bǐngyào) while he was at Harvard Business School. He launched the MyTeksi app in Malaysia in 2012 together with Tan Hooi Ling, another Harvard graduate. MyTeksi was started with an initial grant of US$25,000 from Harvard Business School and Tan's personal capital.

GrabTaxi expanded to the Philippines in August 2013, and to Singapore and Thailand in October of the same year. In 2014, GrabTaxi further continued its growth and expansion to new countries: first launching in Ho Chi Minh City, Vietnam, in February, and Jakarta in Indonesia in June. In November 2014, GrabTaxi launched its first GrabBike service in Ho Chi Minh City as a trial service.

By 2015, GrabBike's motorcycle service rides had spread throughout Vietnam and Indonesia. In February 2015, the company launched GrabCar+ in the Philippines. In November 2015, Grab launched its GrabExpress courier service. In January 2016, GrabTaxi was rebranded as "Grab" with a new, redesigned logo.

=== Launch of super-app in Southeast Asia ===
Parked motorcycles of GrabFood deliverers in Bangkok

In October 2016, Grab added an in-app instant messaging feature called "GrabChat" to allow simple communication between riders and drivers and translate messages if the set languages of the driver and passenger are different. In December 2016, it launched GrabShare taxi and car-sharing services.

In February 2017, Grab launched the GrabCoach service for booking large passenger vehicles. In March 2017, Grab introduced GrabFamily for young children below 7 years old, to fulfill regulations where children under 1.35 metres must be placed on a child booster seat or child restraint.

In April 2017, Grab confirmed the acquisition of Indonesian online payment startup Kudo which was integrated with Grab's payment system.

In November 2017, Grab launched GrabPay payment service as a digital payment service among third-party merchants.

In March 2018, Grab merged with Uber's Southeast Asian operations. As part of the acquisition, Grab took over Uber's assets and operations, including Uber Eats operations in Malaysia, Singapore and Thailand, which led to Grab's expansion of food delivery services. Grab also launched its eScooter rental service known as GrabWheels in March 2018. Uber initially received a 27.5% stake in Grab as part of the deal; as of 2025, Uber holds a 13.71% stake, remaining the largest individual shareholder.

In May 2018, Grab launched GrabFood food delivery service. In October 2018, Grab launched GrabExpress courier service. In 2018, Grab also launched Grab Financial, a financial arm of the company. In November 2018, Grab invested in Indonesian conglomerate Lippo Group's Ovo platform.

In February 2019, the company launched GrabPet in Singapore which uses Grab drivers who have received training in pet handling and welcome animals in their vehicles.

In April 2019, Grab launched its first cloud kitchen, GrabKitchen, in Indonesia under its food delivery service. 50 GrabKitchens were set up in six Southeast Asian countries within a year. Grab also launched their super app in April 2019 to consolidate its online services into one platform.

In February 2020, Grab launched GrabCare for healthcare workers in Singapore, starting with 24-hour services to Tan Tock Seng Hospital and National Centre for Infectious Diseases. Grab also expanded its GrabMart and GrabAssistant services to more cities and countries to meet increased demand for online food and grocery deliveries.

In April 2020, top management salaries were cut by 20 percent and employees were encouraged to take up voluntary no-pay leave in an effort to manage costs during the COVID-19 pandemic. In June 2020, Grab retrenched 360 employees, which was just under 5 percent of the total headcount across its Southeast Asia offices at the time. In November 2020, Grab announced the launch of its Tech Center in Jakarta, Indonesia for micro, small and medium enterprises (MSMEs).

=== Expansion into banking and autonomous vehicles ===
In December 2020, Grab was granted a digital bank licence from Singapore together with Singtel.

Grab debuted on Nasdaq in December 2021 following a SPAC with Altimeter Growth Corp. The company acquired Malaysia's Jaya Grocer by the end of 2021.

In June 2022, the company introduced GrabMaps mapping and location technology for use in "hyperlocal" routes in Southeast Asian cities.

In August 2022, the company launched its digital bank business, GXS Bank, together with Singtel.

In June 2023, Grab announced an 11 percent reduction of its workforce at the time.

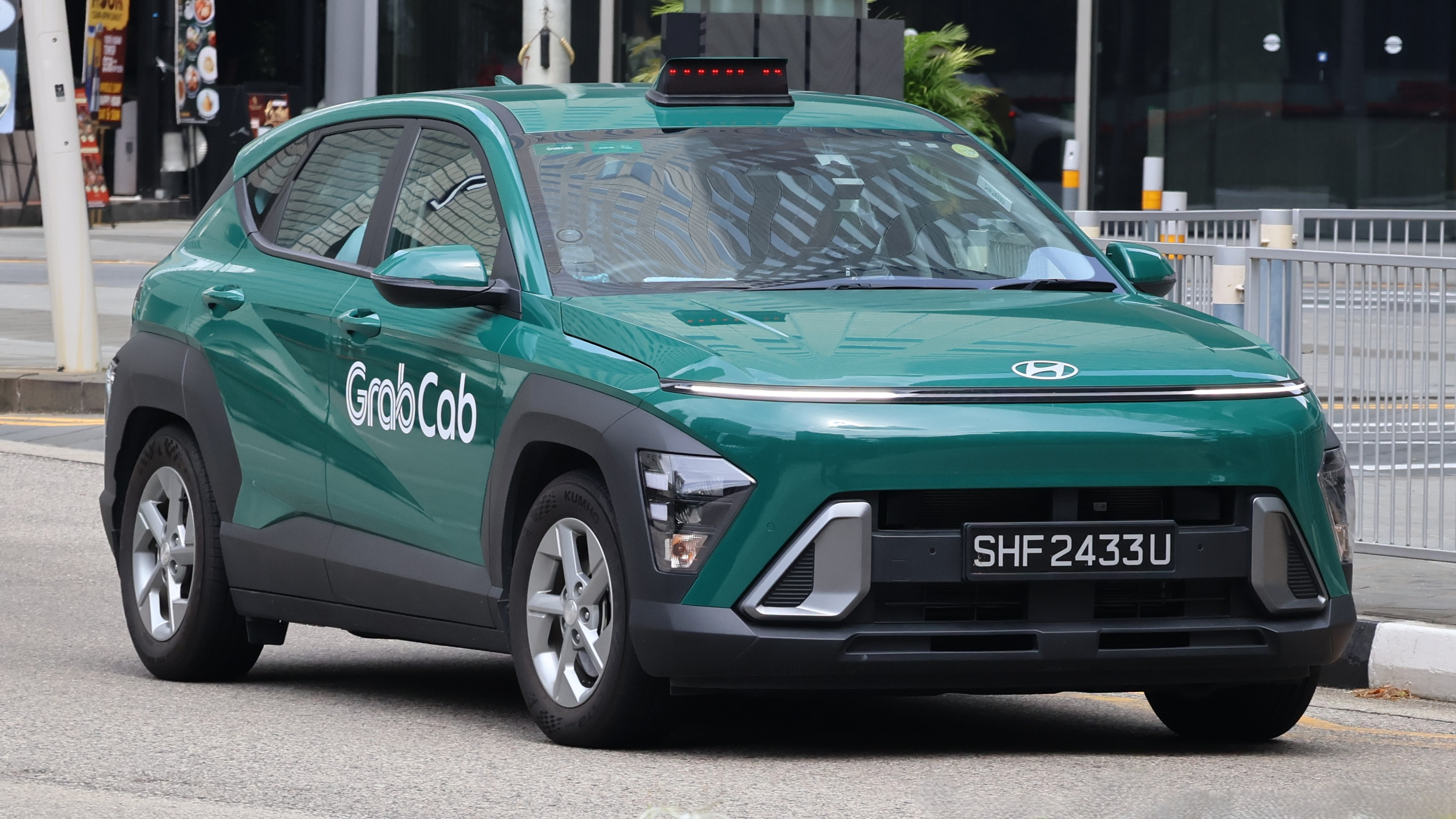
A Hyundai Kona taxi under GrabCab, which began operations in July 2025 and is the sixth taxi company in Singapore

GrabCab received a 10-year street-hail operator licence from Singapore's Land Transport Authority in 2025. It became the sixth taxi operator in the country. Operations began in July that year.

In July 2025, Grab piloted the first digital cycle rickshaw service in Vietnam known as Grab Cyclo. Later that year, the company announced that it was working on a drone commercial delivery service in the Philippines.

In April 2025, Grab released AI Merchant Assistant and AI Driver Companion, two artificial intelligence-based tools developed in collaboration with OpenAI and Anthropic. The former offers business insights to merchants while the latter provides predictive analytics related to high-demand areas and voice reporting to drivers, allowing them to report on road conditions. Grab had previously announced partnerships with autonomous vehicle developers including Motional and WeRide. In December 2025, Grab announced their strategic partnership with Momenta to deploy autonomous driving technology to Southeast Asia.

In November 2025, the Land Transport Authority of Singapore approved Grab and its partner WeRide to conduct autonomous vehicle testing. Grab announced the launch of a three-month drone delivery pilot in Tanjong Rhu, Singapore, which started internal testing as of 7 January 2026.

In January 2026, it was announced that Grab had acquired Infermove, a China-based artificial intelligence robotics developer, to support its delivery operations. In February 2026, it was announced that Grab was acquiring Stash, a U.S.-based digital investment platform. During GrabX, an annual product conference, the company announced multiple AI features for its customers, drivers and merchants. Among the features was a group ride to split fares between travelers, shopping and navigation assistance, tap to pay and loan options. Anthony Tan stated that AI "shouldn't be limited to only those who can afford it" and "everyone, regardless of their technical skills, should have the opportunity to jump on this AI wave and not be left behind".

== Funding ==
Kee Lock Chua, a Managing Partner at Vertex Ventures Southeast Asia and India, was an early investor in Grab. He invested US$11.2m in Grab, and exited the investment in 2019.

Grab's investors include venture and hedge funds, automobile companies and other ride-hailing firms. Investors include Japan's Softbank Group and MUFG, Booking Holdings, Toyota and Microsoft. The company has completed Series A through Series H funding, totaling billions of dollars.

In January 2021, Grab Financial Group, the company's financial services unit, raised more than $300 million from South Korea's Hanwha Asset Management.

== Partnerships ==
The company partnered with Microsoft to help people in Southeast Asia to access digital literacy programs and certificates in September 2019. In December 2019, Grab and Mastercard launched the first numberless payment card in Asia, which was discontinued on 1 June 2024.

Marriott International partnered with Grab to cover about 600 restaurants and bars in Singapore, Indonesia, Malaysia, the Philippines, Vietnam and Thailand which would be added to the GrabFood delivery platform.

The A.S. Watson Group began partnering with Grab at the beginning of 2021 to expand in Southeast Asia. In March 2021, Grab partnered with the Don Quijote discount store chain to deliver everyday goods such as food and cosmetics to customers in Southeast Asia. GrabPay formed a partnership with Stripe in May 2021 to include GrabPay Wallet as a payment option. In July 2021, Grab expanded its buy now, pay later deferred payment options through a partnership with Adyen. In November 2021, Grab partnered with McDonald's in Singapore to integrate GrabExpress, GrabPay and GrabRewards with the restaurant's online and in-store ordering.

In March 2022, the company announced that GrabFood, GrabPay, GrabGifts and its delivery system would be introduced at Starbucks in Thailand, Singapore, Malaysia, Indonesia, Vietnam, and the Philippines. Grab also announced a partnership with Coca-Cola to increase each company's distribution network in the region.

== Driver issues ==
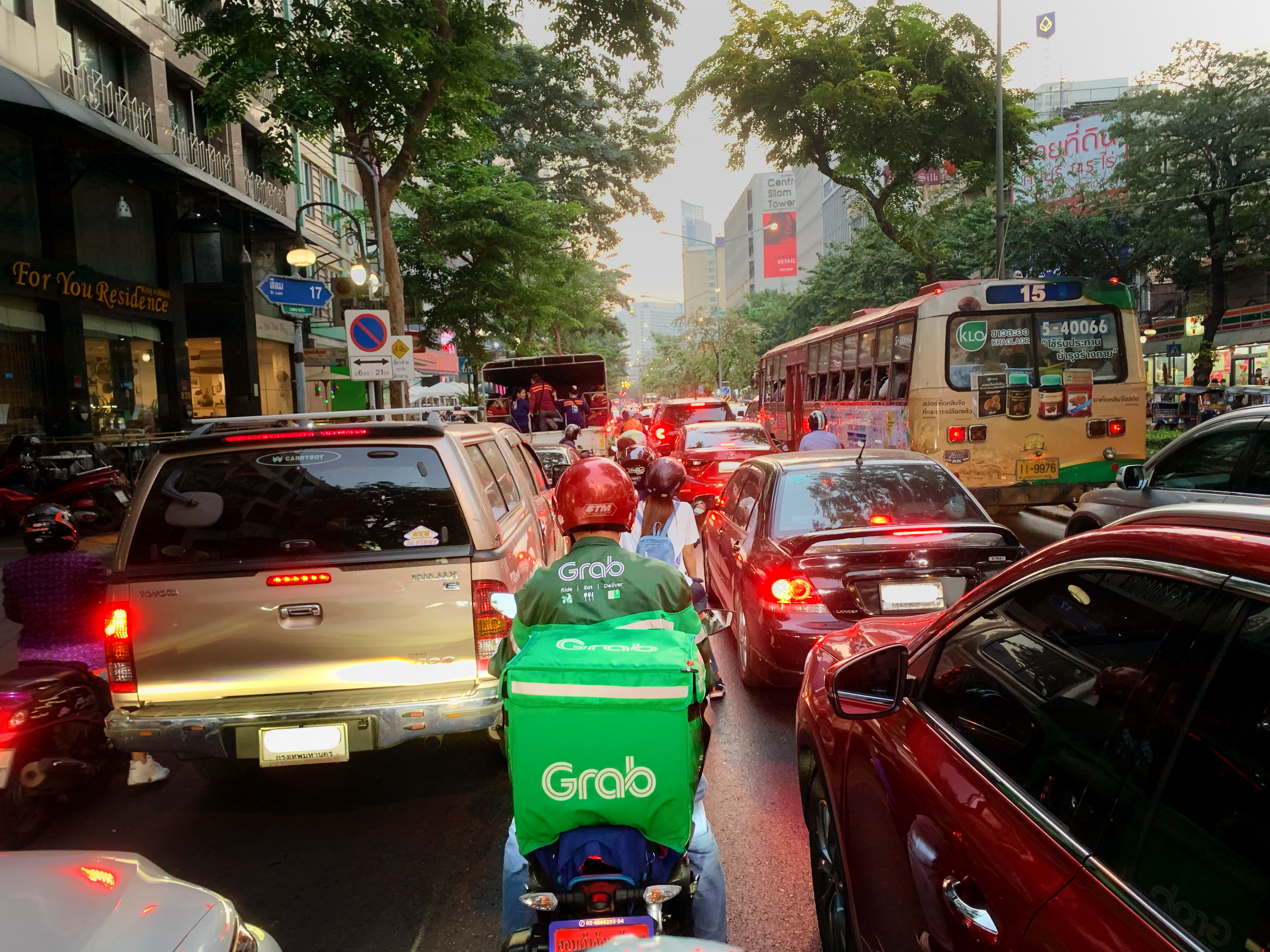
A Grab driver on a Bangkok road

On 23 September 2016, a female passenger in Singapore was sexually assaulted by an elderly GrabCar driver after she fell asleep during the ride. The driver was jailed for 16 months the following year. On 25 March 2017, a female passenger in Singapore was assaulted by a Grab driver. The driver was subsequently suspended by his taxi company from call bookings, although he was still allowed to pick up passengers on the streets. In May, a GrabCar driver in Chiang Mai, Thailand was arrested for sexual assault. In response, Grab issued a statement and said it "would not tolerate physical violence or verbal abuse".

Disputes have occurred between Grab drivers and local taxi operators as taxi drivers complained about a decline in their passenger numbers and income since Grab (and its competitor Uber) began to gain foothold on their areas. Until December 2016, around 65 assault cases towards GrabBike drivers by local taxibike drivers have been reported in Ho Chi Minh City, Vietnam. Much violence has erupted between Grab drivers and motorbike taxis in two major cities of Hanoi and Ho Chi Minh City in Vietnam with another 47 assaults cases recorded in 2017. Grab drivers and passengers in Kuala Lumpur have also been the subject of harassment from local taxi drivers.

On 4 March 2017, a drunk foreign man reportedly attacked a GrabCar driver in Singapore. The man was then arrested and jailed two weeks for his offence. On 26 October, a Grab driver was killed in Pasay, Philippines by a suspect disguised as a legitimate passenger, who subsequently fled with the victim's vehicle and personal belongings. The suspect finally surrendered to police two weeks later and confessed that he accidentally killed the victim after they refused to give him money.

In order to reduce the number of incidents between passengers and drivers, Grab has implemented a number of safety features. Grab installed an emergency button in the app in 2018. Later the same year, Grab rolled out a telematics program to encourage safe driving behaviour for its drivers. In 2019, Grab began asking passengers to take a selfie before riding for identify verification.

== Regulation ==
In the Philippines, GrabCar was fully legalised after being accredited as a Transportation Network Company (TNC) by the Land Transportation Franchising and Regulatory Board (LTFRB) in 2015. In 2016, Grab motorbike taxi services of Grab and Uber were suspended on claims the services are breaking local rules and clashing with registered transport companies. Further crackdown on the services was continued in early 2017 when a Thai transport official asked the government to ban them although little efforts being done as both services have gain popularity among Thais and foreign visitors in the country. In 2019, it was reported that the Thai government is taking steps to legalise Grab taxi services. In 2021, the Thai government approved a draft ministerial regulation, allowing Grab to operate taxi services legally in the area. The regulation allows for vehicles containing up to seven seats which were registered as personal cars to also be used as taxis.

In Singapore, laws that legalised the service were passed in February 2017. A few months later, the Land Transport Authority (LTA) in Singapore introduced a new regulation requiring private hire cars to have Private Hire Car Driver's Vocational Licence (PDVL) which took effect in July 2017.

On 4 April 2017, the Malaysian government tabled amendments to existing transport laws that would regulate transport application services and protect drivers from harassment. Through the amendment, Grab and Uber vehicles were classified as public service vehicles as part of the move to legalise both services in its efforts to transform the country's public transport services. The amendments were passed by the Parliament of Malaysia on 28 July 2017, which directly legalised both services to operate in the country.

In 2017, the Vietnamese Ministry of Transport set to review the legal status of both Grab and Uber to ensure a fair business environment for firms. A draft of a new circular was submitted in early 2018 that includes regulations for passenger transport (by car) through software such as Grab. In early 2020, a decree was passed to legalise Grab and other ride-hailing platforms in Vietnam.

In Cambodia and Singapore, Grab supported local governments in traffic management and infrastructure development through its data and technology. In Malaysia, Grab has also received the support of the Malaysian Public Land Transport Commission (SPAD) when the government department introduced the use of technology using the GrabTaxi application to enhance the efficiency of taxi drivers in Malaysia. The company is working with the government department to improve the image of taxi drivers in the country by making it safer and more convenient to hail a taxi.

== See also ==
- Gojek
