= Never Sleep Again: The Elm Street Legacy =

- Home video release poster, painted by A Nightmare on Elm Street film series' poster artist Matthew Joseph Peak
- Directed by: Daniel Farrands; Andrew Kasch
- Written by: Thommy Hutson
- Produced by: Daniel Farrands; Thommy Hutson
- Narrated by: Heather Langenkamp
- Cinematography: Buz Wallick
- Edited by: Andrew Kasch; Michael Benni Pierce
- Music by: Sean Schafer Hennessy
- Production company: 1428 Films
- Distributed by: 1428 Films
- Release date: May 4, 2010
- Running time: 240 minutes
- Country: United States
- Language: English
- Box office: $404,982

Never Sleep Again: The Elm Street Legacy is a 2010 American direct-to-video documentary film that chronicles the entire Nightmare on Elm Street franchise, except for the 2010 remake. The documentary also explores the rise of New Line Cinema. Written by Thommy Hutson, produced by Daniel Farrands and Thommy Hutson, and co-directed by Daniel Farrands and Andrew Kasch. Heather Langenkamp, who portrayed Nancy Thompson in three of the Nightmare films, served as the project's executive producer and narrator. As of February 2019, the documentary has grossed over $400k from video sales.

== Background ==
=== Production ===
Farrands, Hutson, and Kasch first worked together on the documentary film His Name Was Jason. Farrands and Kasch were subsequently reunited by Paramount Pictures to create bonus features for Friday the 13th DVD deluxe editions, and they later worked together on bonus features for Farrands' The Haunting in Connecticut. According to Farrands, who reunited with Hutson shortly thereafter, they jointly decided that it was time to tell the backstories of how the various Elm Street films were created and decided to fund the entire project independently. In referencing the difficulties faced during the shooting of His Name Was Jason, the Elm Street retrospective would be produced by a smaller core group of artists and editors who were more dedicated to creating a quality film. Interviewees were asked to provide any rare footage, or behind the scenes photos, that had not been seen before. By way of example, Farrands reported that David Schow brought in a tape from his own work on Freddy's Nightmares that included ten minutes of Robert Englund footage that had never been aired. He also shared that during the shooting of the Elm Street films, cast and family members of cast would often take personal photos, which would be highlighted in the finished documentary. At the time of their interview with FEARnet, the production had shot a teaser trailer for the project, some on-location spots and B-roll, and they anticipated principal photography to require a 20- to 25-day shoot. In referencing the writing, Farrands made note that Hutson spent hours creating outlines and structural pieces for production to follow and wrote both the narration and "tens of thousands of questions for the interviewees".

=== Teaser ===
In 2009, as the film was being planned, the production company, 1428 Films, shot a 2-minute teaser-trailer with Heather Langenkamp which was released online to initiate early interest. As interest in the documentary grew, the producers contacted a number of Elm Street alumni and the producers were in turn contacted by many others. The final total of unique interviews was 106 individuals.

=== Artwork ===
In both a nod to the original series and a wish to utilize some of the talent who contributed to the franchise, the makers of the documentary procured the services of poster artist Matthew Joseph Peak to create the original art for the release poster and DVD, and composer Charles Bernstein, who composed the score for the original A Nightmare on Elm Street for the film's main title theme.

== Documentary overview ==
In exploring the Elm Street saga, the film presents photographs, storyboards, conceptual art, publicity materials, archival documents, and behind-the-scenes footage that have never been previously shared. Never Sleep Again expands on Wes Craven's motivations in creating the first Elm Street film. It also explores behind-the-scenes of the original film and all of its sequels. Through interviews, the film shares how cast and crew brought their own worst nightmares to life on screen and examines the impact the series and its mythos have had on pop culture and the horror genre in general. The documentary also explores the rise and fall of Robert Shaye's New Line Cinema and its reputation as "The House That Freddy Built".

== Gay themes in Freddy's Revenge ==
In an article written by Brent Hartinger for After Elton, it is stated that a "frequent debate in gay pop culture circles is this: Just how 'gay' was 1985's A Nightmare on Elm Street 2: Freddy's Revenge (the Elm Street sequel)? The imagery in the movie makes it seem unmistakably gay — but the filmmakers have all along denied that that was their intention." During his interview segment for the documentary, screenwriter David Chaskin admitted that the homosexual themes were intentionally written into the script. The rest of the cast and crew stated that they were unaware of any such themes at the time they made the film, but that a series of creative decisions on the part of director Jack Sholder unintentionally brought Chaskin's themes to the forefront. In his interview, Sholder stated, "I simply didn't have the self-awareness to realize that any of this might be interpreted as gay", while "now-out actor" Mark Patton stated, "I don't think that [the character] Jesse was originally written as a gay character. I think it's something that happened along the line by serendipity."

== Release ==
The documentary was released as a 2-disc DVD set on May 4, 2010. In promotion of the documentary, the filmmakers gave away a limited edition poster autographed by Heather Langenkamp to anyone who ordered the documentary from the official website, with the DVD cover art from original Nightmare poster artist Matthew Joseph Peak. Anyone who ordered the DVD from the website was also entered into a drawing to win one of three 27"×40" teaser posters signed by dozens of the people who worked on the films and were interviewed in the documentary.

=== First disc ===
The first disc shares 106 interviews with many of the cast and crew spanning all of the Elm Street projects, including:

Interviewee	Involvement with Elm Street
Wes Craven	creator of the film series, director of A Nightmare on Elm Street and New Nightmare
Robert Englund	portrayed Freddy Krueger in the first eight films
Heather Langenkamp	portrayed Nancy Thompson in Elm Street Part 1, Part 3 and New Nightmare
Robert Shaye	producer, New Line Cinema
Lisa Wilcox	portrayed Alice Johnson in Elm Street 4 and 5
Jeff Katz	producer, New Line Cinema
John Saxon	portrayed Lt. Thompson in Elm Street Part 1, Part 3 and New Nightmare
Leslie Hoffman	portrayed Hall Guard in A Nightmare on Elm Street
Mark Patton	portrayed Jesse Walsh in A Nightmare on Elm Street 2: Freddy's Revenge
Clu Gulager	portrayed Ken Walsh in Elm Street 2
Christopher Young	composer, Elm Street 2
Alice Cooper	appearance in Freddy's Dead
Dokken	musicians, Elm Street 3
Monica Keena	star of Freddy vs. Jason
Renny Harlin	director, Elm Street 4
Chuck Russell	director, Elm Street 3
Kane Hodder	portrayed Jason Voorhees in four of the Friday the 13th films. He also portrayed Freddy in a small cameo in Jason Goes to Hell: The Final Friday.
Ronny Yu	director, Freddy vs. Jason
Tuesday Knight	portrayed Kristen Parker in Elm Street 4
Kelly Jo Minter	portrayed Yvonne in A Nightmare on Elm Street 5: The Dream Child
Miko Hughes	portrayed Dylan Porter in New Nightmare
David Newsom	portrayed Chase Porter in New Nightmare
Tracy Middendorf	portrayed Julie in New Nightmare

=== Second disc ===
The second disc includes extended interviews and a "first look" at Heather Langenkamp's I Am Nancy. It also includes the featurettes:

- For the Love of the Glove
- Fred Heads: The Ultimate Freddy Fans
- Horror's Hallowed Grounds: Return to Elm Street
- Freddy vs. The Angry Video Game Nerd
- Expanding the Elm Street Universe: Freddy in Comic Books & Novels
- The Music of the Nightmare: Conversations with Composers & Songwriters
- Elm Street's Poster Boy: The Art of Matthew Joseph Peak
- A Nightmare on Elm Street in 10 Minutes

== Reception ==
On Rotten Tomatoes the film has an approval rating of 100%, based on six reviews, with an average rating of 8.5/10. Michael Gingold of Fangoria gave the documentary their highest marks, writing that "the amount of behind-the-scenes and other footage the filmmakers have assembled is nothing short of amazing. Never Sleep Again contains a treasure trove of rare and never-before-seen deleted scenes, FX-creation shots, etc", concluding, "... [the film] truly does do justice to the Elm Street legacy, and even the most die-hard devotees are guaranteed to hear and see a wealth of stories and content they’ve never been aware of before. Fedoras off to the team responsible for this high-water mark in genre documentaries…".

Ryan Daley of Bloody Disgusting also gave the film the site's highest marks, saying, "A perfect 5-Skull rating should serve as a testament to the talent of Daniel Farrands and Andrew Kasch, the filmmaking duo behind this brilliant Nightmare on Elm Street documentary. Even for the casual fan, this is one hell of an educational film." He concluded his review by offering, "There's a lot to love about Never Sleep Again, and virtually nothing to hate. It's not only an expertly crafted film about a beloved horror franchise, it's also a film about the legacy of New Line Cinema, and ultimately, a film about the horror genre as a whole. Frankly, you won't find a horror documentary better than this one."

Jeremy Thomas of 411mania wrote of the documentary, "The first thing to realize regarding Never Sleep Again is the length. The documentary is very nearly four hours long, a length that completely dwarfs that of His Name Was Jason, the documentary made by the same crew which covered the Friday the 13th series". He noted that while a good portion of the film is directed toward coverage of the eight Elm Street movies, he also found "that what's key with each of these segments is that they never seem rushed or superfluous. Each of the interviews adds to the discussion and while some of them joke around a bit, they all provide their own tidbits that add up to a true wealth of knowledge." He noted that while interviews of Johnny Depp, Patricia Arquette and Breckin Meyer were not included, the rest of the interviewees provided information that filled that loss. He also offered that "one of the greatest joys is that the interviews allow us to see where the cast and crew are now". He summarized that the length might cause concern that the documentary might be overlong, but offered that due to "directors Daniel Farrands and Andrew Kasch however, the film is very well-paced and the time flies by." His review concludes by offering detailed information about the video, the audio, the packaging, and about the included special features.

Nick Hyman of Under The Radar gave it a 9/10. He noted that while the earlier Friday the 13th retrospective documentary His Name Was Jason "...was severely gutted by studio interference, this documentary is independently financed and allows the interview subjects to be more candid in their recollections". He offers "While the doc is mostly for fans only, the best material is about the creation of this iconic series on a budget. Independent studio New Line Cinema's rise is mostly because of Elm Street, and the stories from director/creator Wes Craven, New Line head Robert Shaye, and star Robert Englund about financial struggles and tight deadlines are frequently the most enlightening." and concludes, "If you're a fan of the original films, this labor of love is a must-see."

Neil Karassik of Eye Weekly noted that nearly everyone who was involved in the original projects were captured in interviews, opining that "all eight Freddy features plus one surreal syndicated series are explored with staggering depth that never gets tiresome", and also sharing that the "project often surpasses its own subject in terms of giddy inventiveness."

Cameron McGaughy of DVD Talk stated, "Our long journey comes to an end with a beautiful closing where all of the big names share their sense of pride on the projects--a love you can see and feel through every minute of these wonderful four hours. Whether it's Langenkamp sharing Craven's importance in her life or Craven expressing awe that his little film became such an influence and part of pop culture, it's a fitting finish. And no moment is more moving than watching Shaye's eyes tear up as thoughts both painful (his ouster from the company he created) and joyous cross in his mind as he thanks the fans for the incredible journey."

== Awards ==
The film won in the "Best Direct-to-Video Title" and "Best in Show" categories at Home Media Magazine's 2010 Reaper Awards, a yearly DVD show held at the Roosevelt Hotel in Hollywood, CA.

The film was also the recipient of the 2010 Saturn Award for Best DVD Release of the Year.
