= 1428 Elm Street =

Fictional house from the Nightmare on Elm Street franchise

- A Nightmare on Elm Street location
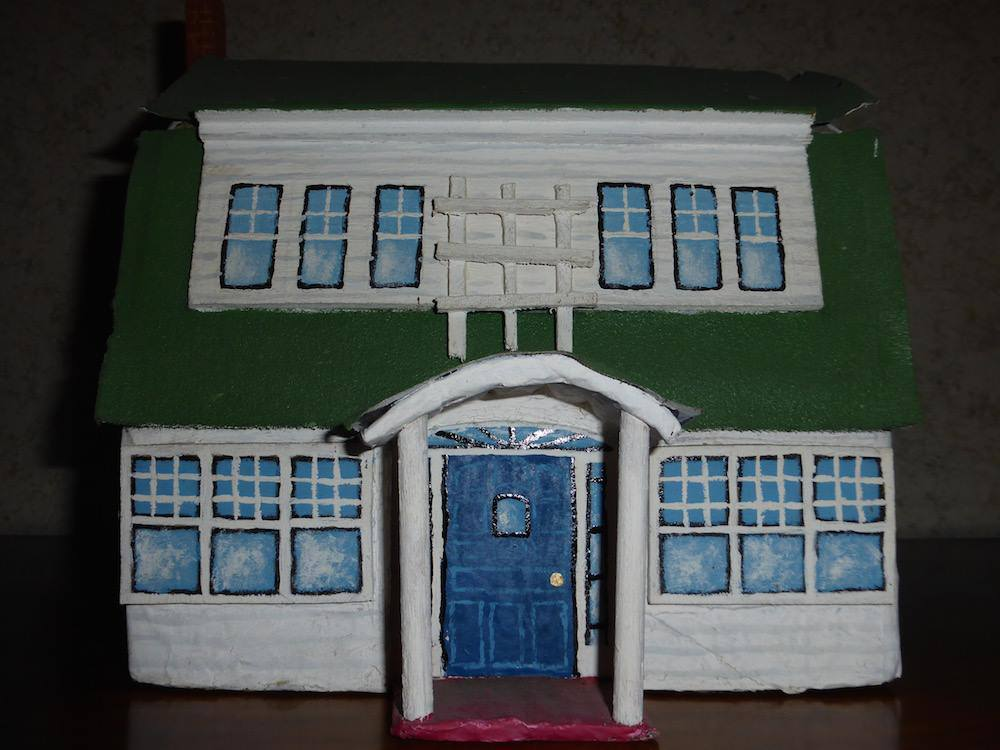
- Model of the house as appears in the 1984 film
- First appearance: A Nightmare on Elm Street (1984)
- Last appearance: Freddy vs Jason (2003)
- Created by: Wes Craven
- Genre: Horror film

In-universe information
- Other name: [The] Elm Street House
- Type: Residential house
- Characters: Nancy Thompson; Jesse Walsh; Lori Campbell; Freddy Krueger (possibly)
- Location: Springwood, Ohio
- Street: Elm Street

1428 Elm Street, also known as the Elm Street house, is a fictional residential house and street address in Springwood, Ohio, and is an important location in the A Nightmare on Elm Street franchise, where it has been the home of Nancy Thompson and her mother, later Jesse Walsh and his family, and finally Lori Campbell and her father, throughout the film series. It has also been implied to have been Freddy Krueger's home at some point before the events that take place in the films. It appears in some form in nearly all the films, as well as literature, comic books, toys, and music videos. The house, like Freddy Krueger, Nancy Thompson, Tina Gray, and Kristen Parker, were all conceived by Wes Craven.

== Appearances ==
=== Films ===
1428 Elm Street is first introduced in A Nightmare on Elm Street (1984), where it is owned by Marge Thompson, who lives there with her teenage daughter Nancy. There is seemingly nothing out of the ordinary about the house at the time, but this changes when Nancy and her friends start to have a series of nightmares all featuring the same disfigured, menacing stalker, culminating in Nancy's best friend Tina Gray being slaughtered in her bed by an unseen assailant in the Gray's house on the same street. Piecing together the lore surrounding Freddy Krueger, Nancy learns that her parents along with others lynched and torched Freddy to death after he had murdered around 20 kids in the neighborhood; they also hid his old murder weapon, a glove with knives attached to it, in a boiler in the basement of the Thompson's home. Nancy finds a way to bring Freddy out of her dreams and confronts him in 1428 Elm Street, luring him through a series of boobytraps and setting him on fire. He is temporarily vanquished when Nancy convinces him and herself that he has no power over her unless she believes he has, and tells him that she takes back the energy she gave him. The comics Nightmares on Elm Street reveals that after this, Nancy moved away from Springwood and went to college in the span between the first film and Dream Warriors.

The sequel A Nightmare on Elm Street 2: Freddy's Revenge (1985) insinuates that the house had stood unoccupied following the conclusion of the first film. After about five years, the Walsh family moved in, but Freddy's spirit lingered as a residual memory in the house, geographically restricted to it for the moment, and started to invade the dreams of the new occupant Jesse Walsh as he did with Nancy, now with the additional goal of possessing him and making Jesse kill for him.

In A Nightmare on Elm Street 3: Dream Warriors (1987), Freddy seems to have "adopted" the house in the dreamworld, luring his victims there even when their dreams do not start in the house. Freddy increasingly tended to blend the house together with the old power plant he worked in and brought his victims to while he was alive; the power plant was the place he lured Nancy into in her nightmare in school in the first film. By the time of The Dream Master, the real life 1428 Elm Street has become an uninhabited and boarded up ghost house since the Walsh's moved out at an unknown date - with Dream Warriors having left their fates unresolved - and would continue being so for many years. Before the events of Dream Warriors, Kristen Parker builds a model of the house she keeps seeing in her nightmares. After being admitted to and later released from the Westin Hills Asylum, she had come to consider the house Freddy's "home" due to its recurrence in her nightmares. Before Freddy kills Kristen, her dreams would see her return to the dream-house and its boiler room many times, even when Freddy was dormant.

Though not seen in reality in The Dream Child, the dream version of the house is part of the vistas seen by Alice Johnson in her struggles with Freddy. By this stage Freddy had further perverted the dream-house into a M. C. Escher-esque labyrinth by also integrating the Westin Hills Asylum and the Dream Church from the two previous films into it. In Freddy's Dead, the house was visited by protagonists such as John Doe and Maggie Burroughs and the film often hinted at the idea that Freddy and his family had once lived there when he was alive.

The house also appears in the climax of Wes Craven's New Nightmare (1994), when a metafictional Heather Langenkamp channels her in-universe character Nancy Thompson and Heather's house turns into 1428 Elm Street. In Freddy vs Jason (2003), the house is occupied by Dr. Campbell and his daughter Lori; Freddy murdered Mrs. Campbell in their bedroom after the events of Freddy's Dead: The Final Nightmare took place. In a scene that was cut from the theatrical film, Lori scratches the repainted door to discover the original red paint underneath.

=== Other appearances ===
==== Halloween Horror Nights ====
The house was one of the haunted houses at Universal Orlando's Halloween Horror Nights: Carnival of Carnage in 2007; the exterior had been modeled after the worn down dream version from Dream Warriors and The Dream Master. It was also recreated for Universal Studios Hollywood's 2008 event called "Nightmare on Elm Street: Home Sweet Hell" The house appeared again as a setting during Halloween Horror Nights 25 in 2015 at its "Freddy vs Jason" event.

==== Literature and comics ====
In the Nightmare on Elm Street comics first two issues, set in 1990, Nancy Thompson's former roommate Cybil Houch sees the house in her recent nightmares about someone who appears to be Jack the Ripper; the sight of the house leads her to track down Nancy only to find that she died three years ago. Nancy also uses her own version of the house as her "safe haven" in the dream world. The house is seen in Freddy vs. Jason vs. Ash #5, where a fight between Jason Voorhees and Ash Williams causes it to collapse.

In the short story "Asleep at the Wheel" by Brian Hodge from the anthology book The Nightmares on Elm Street: Freddy Krueger's Seven Sweetest Dreams (1991), a band that has named themselves "Nancy Thompson Gravewatch" decides to spend the night at 1428 Elm Street, which "has sat idle and abandoned and vacant and boarded over for years" as described in the story. The band's idea with staying at the house is to confront their inner darkness and make it their own. They are warned against it by Nancy's ghost, but the band refuses to listen and are picked off one by one by Freddy. In the short story "Dead Highway, Lost Roads" from the same book the house along with most of Elm Street has been leveled to the ground and replaced with a shopping mall to help bury the bad reputation that it had gained; Alice Johnson lives nearby, to keep a vigil on Freddy's activities. In the novel A Nightmare on Elm Street: Suffer the Children, taking place after the events of Freddy vs. Jason, Lori Campbell has moved out of Springwood and 1428 Elm Street is now occupied by Alexandra Corwin and her mother.

==== Online game ====
The house is the central setting of an unofficial, fan-made, online game titled Escape from 1428 Elm Street.

==== Music videos ====
In the music video for The Fat Boys' Are You Ready for Freddy, the band has to stay one night in the house of one of the Boys' recently deceased "Uncle Frederick". The music video for Dokken's Dream Warriors song is mostly set in the nightmare version of the house, as visited by Kristen Parker in the Dream Warriors film.

==== Unrealized projects ====
The house has been featured in several alternate screenplays that was never filmed. For the third film which became Dream Warriors, Robert Englund wrote his own treatment Freddy's Funhouse, where Freddy had claimed the house for his own in the dream world, setting up booby traps against dreamers like Nancy did against him. In an alternate script for A Nightmare on Elm Street 5: The Dream Child by John Skipp & Craig Spector, a character is painting a drawing of the Elm Street house, only to be interrupted by a bulldozer leveling the legally condemned building to the ground to make way for the Elm St. Mall. In the original script for Freddy's Dead: The Final Nightmare by Michael Almereyda, a character walks up to the house and removes plates of the mailbox with the name Williams, the last owners, to reveal the name Thompson underneath, which in turn has the name Krueger underneath this. Several alternate drafts for Freddy vs Jason featured the house, including scripts by Peter Briggs, Reiff/Voris and Abernathy/Schow; in the latter, a rundown 1428 Elm Street is blown up following a shootout between a SWAT team and a twisted Freddy-worshipping cultist group, culminating in the latter detonating a bomb in the basement.

In David Bishop's finished but never published sequel to his novel A Nightmare on Elm Street: Suffer the Children, called House of 100 Maniacs, Alexandra Corwin was deemed insane, incriminated for eight murders in truth committed by Freddy and had to spend five years in a maximum security psychiatric ward before being released, brainwashed into thinking that Freddy was nothing but a delusion of hers. As a final part of her therapy, her psychotherapist convinces her that she must go to her former home, the once-again boarded up 1428 Elm Street (now scheduled for demolition), in order to face her demons. The house, however, attracts many who are intrigued by its reputation as a haunted house, providing Freddy with yet another batch of victims to slaughter. Alex and a girl named Jenny survive, while in the epilogue the house would finally have been demolished. The unpublished novel would also have established that Freddy did live at 1428 as a child.

== Development ==
From the first film to the sequels, the Elm Street house develops from simply being the place where the action takes to becoming the embodiment of Freddy in the physical world, taking on the characteristics of a classic haunted house and acting as a portal between the waking life and the dream world when characters steps in through the door of the house. In the original script for Dream Warriors, the house seen by the Elm Street children in their nightmares is not 1428 Elm Street, but a ranch house where Freddy was born; this idea was omitted in the theatrical film. The novelization The Nightmares on Elm Street Parts 1, 2, 3: The Continuing Story, written by Jeffrey Cooper, uses the original script rather than the film script; thus, the ranch house also appears in the Dream Warriors chapter in the book. A non-canonical alternate backstory for 1428 Elm Street was featured in The Life and Death of Freddy Krueger, contained within Cooper's novelization, where the house is described to have once have been a mental asylum where Freddy was born to an unnamed female patient with schizophrenia who died in childbirth; the former asylum at 1428 is also present in Cooper's novelization of Dream Warriors, where it's called the Hathaway House.

=== Filming locations ===
Scenes at the house from the original film were filmed at a private home located at 1428 North Genesee Avenue in Los Angeles,which was constructed in the year 1919. It was also used in Freddy's Revenge and Wes Craven's New Nightmare. Bloody Disgusting suggested that the house was also used for pickup scenes in the extended TV version of the original Halloween film, pointing out the common presence of a decorative wooden horse in the filmed scenes and the pre-renovation house at 1428 North Genesee Avenue as a clue to this. Sean Clark, host of Horrors Hallowed Grounds, was able to visit the house in 2006 before massive renovations completely erased any likeness to the interior as seen in the films. According to Clark, Nancy's room as seen in A Nightmare on Elm Street had not been a room in the actual house, but one inside a studio set. Carpenter however had gained permission to film inside the actual house, whereas Heather Langenkamp as Nancy was only inside the house at 1428 North Genesee Avenue for scenes where she's looking out from her bedroom window. Leaked information from a Zillow listing in October 2021 revealed that the home had been owned by musical comedian Bo Burnham and his girlfriend, filmmaker Lorene Scafaria, since around 2013; during this time, the home had served as a filming location for the end of Burnham's 2016 special Make Happy and the entirety of his 2021 special Inside.

The house was put up for sale during 2006. It was in a state of negligence and worn down when Angie Hill bought it in 2008; she paid $1.15 million for the house then and began a year-long renovation. According to Hill, the previous owners had neglected it to such an extent that it might have been the slummiest house on the street. She preserved its facade throughout the renovation to retain much of its original looks. Hill renovated as much as 90% of the original interior. The house switched owners in 2013 for the price of $2.1 million. Heather Langenkamp and Sean Clark visited the house at 1428 North Genesee Avenue in the franchise documentary Never Sleep Again: The Elm Street Legacy from 2010, where Hill explains that the original numbers spelling out 1428 had been stolen; the original font could not be replaced as it was no longer being manufactured. Heather and Robert Englund (Freddy Krueger) also revisited the house together in 2013, while Lisa Wilcox (Alice Johnson) visited it in 2017.

The color of the front door was blue in A Nightmare on Elm Street, but was painted blood red for Freddy's Revenge; red would remain the preferred color throughout the franchise except for when Wes Craven had it restored to blue for New Nightmare, which was once again filmed at 1428 North Genesee Avenue, whereas parts 3-6 had all used facade sets for the likeness of the house's front. Freddy vs. Jason filmed with a different house than the other films as it was filmed in Vancouver and not Los Angeles. In the film, the door was originally red but had been painted over with yellow color. According to production designer John Willett, the process of a finding a matching house in Vancouver was very difficult and earlier film teams from the Nightmare series had not preserved accurate drawing records that the new team could follow, but they eventually found a house that was an 80% match of its Los Angeles predecessor, and shot the scenes inside the house instead of a stage due to budget concerns.

== Description ==
=== Setting ===
The house is located on Elm Street in the fictional town of Springwood in Ohio.

In the script for the 1984 film, Wes Craven mentions Los Angeles in California as the setting and has Elm Street located in an unnamed suburb, but this information is left out of the film until minor details. For example Glen is calling "the airport" on the phone, a few palm trees can be seen and in one shot at the Evergreen Cemetery you can clearly see the blue California license tag. Even including part 4 are seen the California license tags on cars and palm trees in the background for many times. The change from California to Ohio was possibly done as a homage to Wes Craven, who was born in Cleveland in Ohio. Fact is, that the state Ohio was named for the first time in part 6 Freddy's Dead but never before. The name Springwood and its change from suburb to town was introduced in Freddy's Revenge.

The script to Freddy's Dead: The Final Nightmare humorously refers to Elm Street as:

The supreme "bad place" of the universe. A street that ranks right there with "The Flying Dutchman", and "The Bermuda Triangle". The street that makes The Amityville Horror look like a Long Island tupperware party.

Many of the other characters in the series live on Elm Street, such as Glen Lantz, Rick, and Alice Johnson, who says the child murders by pre-lynching Freddy Krueger happened "right here on Elm Street".

=== Freddy's home ===
Early in the series, it was more ambiguous whether the house was Freddy's or not, or merely tied to him because of Nancy. Freddy's Dead: The Final Nightmare, however, confirms that Freddy lived at 1428 with his wife and daughter.

In The Dream Master, Kristen Parker refers to 1428 Elm Street as Freddy's home while visiting it in real life with her friends. Halloween Horror Nights and various media such as Escape from 1428 Elm Stree propagates the idea of the Thompson/Walsh house also having been Freddy's house.

In the book The Nightmare Never Ends: The Official History of Freddy Krueger and the Nightmare on Elm Street Films, Andy Mangels supplies a map of Springwood that lists Elm Street residents and lists the Kruegers as living on 1665 Elm Street, and further argues that the houses might only look similar due to having the same designers. A Nightmare on Elm Street: The Beginning, Andy Mangels' two-issue comic book sequel to Freddy's Dead: The Final Nightmare that was never finished due to the bankruptcy of Innovation Publishing, would have established that the reason why Freddy is consistently drawn to 1428 Elm Street is because his original glove is hidden in its cellar. The webmaster of Nightmare on Elm Street Companion says instead, however, that Freddy's Dead: The Final Nightmare definitely portrayed Freddy's original home as being 1428 Elm Street, including a deleted scene where Maggie finds a hidden room in the basement of the house where Freddy kept all his weapons and tools designed for murder when he lived, and that the franchise has consistently referred to the house as "Freddy's house".

== Legacy ==
The house has been referred to as "one of the most legendary horror homes in movies" and "the star of A Nightmare on Elm Street". Mark Swift and Damian Shannon choose 1428 Elm Street along with Westin Hills Psychiatric Hospital as the token "classic locations" representing the franchise in Freddy vs. Jason, while Camp Crystal Lake represented the Friday the 13th series.

The horror blog 1428 Elm and the production company 1428 Films that has produced the documentaries Never Sleep Again: The Elm Street Legacy and Crystal Lake Memories: The Complete History of Friday the 13th and helped produce films such as The Haunting of Sharon Tate have both derived their names from the fictional house. Mondo created a printing for MondoCon 2016 based on the 1428 Elm Street for their "Home" series of iconic horror locations, and the company Hawthorne Village has made a miniature of the "haunted house" version of the house as part of their Village of Horror series.

1428 Elm Street was second on GamesRadar's list of the "50 Scariest Horror Movie Houses", being beaten by the Saeki house. Because of its iconic status among horror fans, the 1428 North Genesee Avenue house is popularly referred to as the "Nightmare on Elm Street House" and some fans make pilgrimages to see the real life location.
