= Scream, Queen! My Nightmare on Elm Street =

2019 American documentary film

- Promotional release poster by Matt Ryan Tobin
- Directed by: Roman Chimienti; Tyler Jensen
- Produced by: Roman Chimienti; Mark Patton
- Starring: Mark Patton; Robert Englund; Jack Sholder; David Chaskin; Kim Myers; Robert Rusler; Marshall Bell; Clu Gulager; Andrew Scahill; Joann Willett
- Narrated by: Cecil Edward Baldwin
- Music by: Alexander Taylor
- Production company: The End Productions
- Distributed by: Virgil Films
- Release date: April 5, 2019 (CIFF)
- Running time: 99 minutes
- Country: United States
- Language: English
- Box office: $24,897

Scream, Queen! My Nightmare on Elm Street is a 2019 American documentary film directed by Roman Chimienti and Tyler Jensen. It examines the legacy of A Nightmare on Elm Street 2: Freddy's Revenge, the second installment in the A Nightmare on Elm Street film series, and the life of the film's lead actor, Mark Patton. In particular, Freddy's Revenge has garnered a reputation for its homoerotic themes and subject material, which affected Patton, who was closeted at the time of the film's production.

== Release ==
Scream, Queen! premiered at the Cleveland International Film Festival in Cleveland, Ohio, on April 5, 2019. It later screened at Fantastic Fest on September 22, 2019, where it was followed by a screening of Freddy's Revenge in 35 mm.

It had a limited theatrical run on February 27, 2020, and was released digitally and on DVD on March 3.

== Critical reception ==
On the review aggregator website Rotten Tomatoes, the film has an approval rating of 100% based on 44 reviews, with an average rating of 8.2/10. The consensus reads: "Scream, Queen! My Nightmare on Elm Street compassionately draws on an actor's personal journey to offer a compelling and illuminating reexamination of the franchise's first sequel." On Metacritic, the film has a weighted average of 64 out of 100 based on five critic reviews, indicating "generally favorable reviews".

Deirdre Crimmins of Rue Morgue called the film "a tight, straightforward documentary about one corner of the horror world that has been under appreciated for so long, and it is a love letter to those who have always loved it." Trace Thurman of Bloody Disgusting called it "a touching, poignant film that's less about the A Nightmare on Elm Street franchise and more about how one man took control of his narrative and used it to empower not only himself, but millions of queer horror fans around the world." Jude Dry of IndieWire gave it a grade of "A−", and wrote that "Scream, Queen! reaches into the fabulous recesses of queer horror fans, filmmakers, and academics to offer a well-rounded and humorous accounting of the queer cult classic."

Frank Scheck of The Hollywood Reporter wrote that "Scream, Queen! feels a bit self-indulgent at times, exploring so many tangents that it tends to lose focus. Nonetheless, it's a fascinating sociological examination of the circumstances surrounding a film that inadvertently became a camp classic." Michael Ordoña of the Los Angeles Times wrote that "Perhaps the slickly made documentary overstates the cultural impact of a little-seen and widely disliked film. However, it earns points for scraping at the surface of something rarely discussed in film fandom — homosexuality in horror." Blake Goble of Consequence of Sound gave the film a "B+", and called it "a stirring Hollywood history lesson, and a convincing plea for inclusion as one of fandom's better sides. [...] This is the silver lining along Freddy Krueger's nasty claws."

Variety's Dennis Harvey gave a more critical review of the film, writing: "Whiny, still-resentful and at times contradictory in his perspective, Patton can't help but view this story as 'all about me,' even when (eventually) others call him on that tunnel vision. His somewhat garbled sense of victimization gets in the way of addressing other interesting issues about Freddy's Revenge, leaving this just-adequately crafted doc middling at best as a sort of glorified DVD-extra inquiry."

=== Accolades ===
Scream, Queen! My Nightmare on Elm Street was nominated for the 2021 GLAAD Media Award for Outstanding Documentary.
