= Jesse Walsh =

Fictional character

- A Nightmare on Elm Street character
- First appearance: A Nightmare on Elm Street 2: Freddy's Revenge
- Created by: David Chaskin
- Portrayed by: Mark Patton

In-universe information
- Full name: Jesse Walsh
- Occupation: High school student
- Status: Unknown

Jesse Walsh is a fictional character in the A Nightmare on Elm Street franchise. He was created by David Chaskin and portrayed by Mark Patton. Making his debut in A Nightmare on Elm Street 2: Freddy's Revenge in 1985, Jesse became the first male protagonist of the series. In Freddy's Revenge, Freddy enacts a plan to possess Jesse, using his body to kill in the real world, slowly gaining the strength to manifest his form physically. Outside of the films, Jesse has a main role in the novels. Because of the LGBT representation in a mainstream film, Jesse has developed a large fan base in the gay community and has been called a gay icon. Jesse has been observed by some scholars as a variation of the "final girl" slasher film archetype, and instead a "final boy".

== Appearances ==
=== In film ===
In A Nightmare on Elm Street 2: Freddy's Revenge, Jesse is a high school student who moves into Nancy Thompson's old house on 1428 Elm Street with his family and begins to have nightmares about Freddy Krueger. Jesse first encounters Freddy in a nightmare sequence that takes place on a school bus. Jesse takes his friend Lisa to school and becomes friends with a boy named Ron Grady after they fight. Lisa helps Jesse unpack his things after school and they find a diary from Nancy Thompson explaining her nightmares. Jesse realizes that Freddy wants to possess him and use his body to kill in the real world. Freddy successfully controls him and kills Jesse's coach and attempts to kill Jesse's sister though Jesse is able to resist.

He seeks help from Ron and asks him to watch over him while he sleeps but when Ron falls asleep, Freddy regains control and murders Ron. Jesse retreats to Lisa's house during a party but Freddy again takes control, trying to kill her. Jesse fights back against his control and Freddy instead turns on the other teenagers present, murdering seven before disappearing. Freddy travels to the boiler room where he would take his child victims while still alive. Lisa confronts Freddy and Jesse is able to finally regain control, exorcising Freddy. After this incident while travelling on the school bus with Lisa, their friend Kerry is impaled through the chest by Freddy and the bus careens off the road, revealing Freddy is still alive and has again trapped Jesse. His fate is left ambiguous.

Jesse briefly appears in flashbacks during Freddy's introduction in Freddy vs. Jason (2003).

=== In literature ===
Jesse is the lead protagonist of the 1992 novelization of A Nightmare on Elm Street 2: Freddy's Revenge. In 2012, Mark Patton released Jesse's Lost Journal. There are 68 journal entries that span 1982–1985. The first 30 entries closely follow the events of A Nightmare on Elm Street 2: Freddy's Revenge, though unveil new details not seen on screen (hints that Jesse's father is a pedophile; Jesse's platonic love for Lisa; his homosexual feelings for a classmate; his feeling of Nancy Thompson as a kindred spirit). There is a different conclusion in that Jesse supposedly kills Lisa Webber at the power plant, rather than the film's final bus sequence (although she is later revealed to have survived). The remaining 38 journal entries focus on Jesse's time at a psychiatric ward, his sentencing for murdering Ron Grady and the apparent disappearance of Lisa's corpse, his escape from the institution, and his efforts to build a new identity. Jesse still wrestles with Freddy Krueger in his mind, and enters into a panic when Hollywood begins making the Nightmare on Elm Street films based on Jesse's and Nancy Thompson's journal entries.

== Development ==
=== Conception ===
In an interview, Mark Patton stated, "I don't think that [the character] Jesse was originally written as a gay character. I think it's something that happened along the line by serendipity."

=== Casting ===
“Brad Pitt and Christian Slater also came in to read for the role. I had no idea who they were and how many famous people I actually rejected in favour of Mark Patton.”

— Jack Sholder (2010)

Mark Patton beat out actors such as Brad Pitt, Christian Slater and Matt Damon for the role of Jesse and revealed that he based certain aspects of the character on Ally Sheedy's character in The Breakfast Club (1985). In an interview with Attitude magazine, Robert Englund stated "... the second Nightmare on Elm Street is obviously intended as a bisexual themed film. It was early '80s, pre-AIDS paranoia. Jesse's wrestling with whether to come out or not and his own sexual desires was manifested by Freddy. His friend is the object of his affection. That's all there in that film. We did it subtly but the casting of Mark Patton was intentional too, because Mark was out and had done Come Back to the Five and Dime, Jimmy Dean, Jimmy Dean." Yet, in the documentary Scream, Queen! My Nightmare on Elm Street, Patton describes being a closeted lead actor appearing in a horror film with a gay subtext. After Freddy's Revenge, Patton shouldered the negative publicity. His ability to get good roles became limited and he felt increasingly pressured to put up a heterosexual facade in his personal life while being offered homosexual roles in on screen. He eventually became tired of juggling the disingenuousness of the work while watching close friends and a long time partner, Timothy Patrick Murphy, lose his life to AIDS in 1988.

Patton discovered his own positive HIV status in 1999 and later relocated to Mexico to start a new life. The documentary addresses Patton's grudge against screenwriter David Chaskin for his denying that gay elements were purposely written into the script.

== Reception ==
In his book Monsters in the Closet: Homosexuality and the Horror Film, Harry M. Benshoff references Jesse, stating the following:

"Unlike the other films in the series, the protagonist of Freddy's Revenge is a teenage boy, one whom Freddy spends most of the film trying to "get inside of." Jesse is played with a sweet gay boy aura by actor Mark Patton, who played the preoperative transsexual Karen Black in Robert Altman's Come back to the Five-and Dime, Jimmy Dean, Jimmy Dean (1982). Jesse is introduced as the new kid in town, a loner and an outcast, and spends much of the film in his jockey-shorts, sweat glistening off his bare chest as he repeatedly wakes up from Freddy Krueger-inspired nightmares, which, as at least one author has noted, also suggests the imagery of AIDS-related night sweats."

In The Queer Encyclopedia of Film & Television, Claude J. Summers stated:

"...Nightmare on Elm Street 2 (1985) features both an out homosexual in the form of a sadistic gym coach (who is brutally dispatched in a Grand Guignol shower scene) and a coded/closeted queer boy, Jesse (Mark Patton), whose outsiderness attracts the attention of the monster Freddy Krueger (Robert Englund). Harry Benshoff reads the scene of the coach's death-which occurs through Freddy's inhabiting, that is, penetrating, Jesse-as a version of homosexual panic that results in Jesse himself, an extension of the 1950s theme of the sophisticated older homosexual taking charge of a vulnerable, wavering younger man."

In Hearths of Darkness: The Family in the American Horror Film, Updated Edition, Tony Williams notes that Jesse is a victim of a "dysfunctional family situation." Jesse and Freddy's relationship is intended to have a homo-erotic subtext with Freddy representing Jesse's fear of 'coming out'. Commentators point to the lack of interest Jesse shows in Lisa and his retreat to Ron's bedroom after a failed attempt at kissing her, implying Ron is the object of Jesse's affection. At one point in the film, he also ends up in a gay S&M club where he is confronted by his homosexual gym teacher, Schneider. This plot is not made obvious in the film though Krueger-actor, Robert Englund and writer David Chaskin both admit to the concealed subtext, indicating that the casting of openly gay actor Mark Patton to play the role was intentional. In Legacy of Blood: A Comprehensive Guide to Slasher Movies, Jim Harper describes Jesse as "the main victim of the film."

In Remaking Horror: Hollywood's New Reliance on Scares of Old, James Francis Jr. dubbed the character as a "final boy" and noted the parallels between Jesse and Nancy Thompson, stating:

"In the franchise this production became known as the "gay sequel," because the filmmakers presented the audience with a final boy scenario that adhered to final girl rules. In a reversal of conventional gender roles, Jesse wakes from his nightmares screaming in a high-pitched voice, his clothing is feminized (tight jeans, colorful shirts, ornate accessories), and his would-be girlfriend (Lisa) plays the supportive boyfriend role. He dances to cutesy pop music and visits his best male friend (a fit muscular guy clad only in tight briefs) in the dead of the night with the request that he watch over him while he sleeps-in the same manner Nancy petitioned Glen in the original film. Jesse takes Nancy's role as the final "girl," and the script befits a female protagonist.
