= A Nightmare on Elm Street =

1984 film by Wes Craven

- Theatrical release poster
- Directed by: Wes Craven
- Written by: Wes Craven
- Produced by: Robert Shaye
- Starring: John Saxon; Ronee Blakley; Heather Langenkamp; Amanda Wyss; Nick Corri; Johnny Depp; Robert Englund
- Cinematography: Jacques Haitkin
- Edited by: Patrick McMahon; Rick Shaine
- Music by: Charles Bernstein
- Production companies: New Line Cinema; Media Home Entertainment; Smart Egg Pictures
- Distributed by: New Line Cinema
- Release date: November 9, 1984
- Running time: 91 minutes
- Country: United States
- Language: English
- Budget: $1.1 million
- Box office: $57.1 million

A Nightmare on Elm Street is a 1984 American supernatural slasher film written and directed by Wes Craven, and produced by Robert Shaye. It is the first installment in the A Nightmare on Elm Street franchise and stars Heather Langenkamp, John Saxon, Ronee Blakley, Robert Englund as Freddy Krueger, and Johnny Depp in his film debut. The film's plot concerns a group of teenagers who are targeted by Krueger, an undead child killer who murders teenagers through their dreams, as retribution against their parents who burned him alive. Craven loosely based the screenplay on a series of news stories about Hmong refugees dying in the middle of nightmares.

Craven filmed A Nightmare on Elm Street in Los Angeles on an estimated budget of $1.1 million. It was one of the first films produced by New Line Cinema, who by that point mostly distributed films, leading the company to become a successful mini-major film studio and earning it the nickname "The House that Freddy Built". The film is credited with carrying on many tropes found in low-budget horror films of the 1970s and 1980s, originating in John Carpenter's Halloween (1978), including the morality play that revolves around sexual promiscuity in teenagers resulting in their eventual death, leading to the term "slasher film". Critics and film historians state that the film's premise is the struggle to define the distinction between dreams and reality, manifested by the lives and dreams of the teens in the film. Later critics praise the film's ability to transgress "the boundaries between the imaginary and real", toying with audience perceptions.

A Nightmare on Elm Street was released on November 9, 1984, and grossed $57.1 million worldwide. The film received critical acclaim upon its release, and has since been considered to be one of the greatest horror films ever made. In 2021, A Nightmare on Elm Street was selected for preservation in the United States National Film Registry by the Library of Congress as being "culturally, historically, or aesthetically significant". The film spawned a franchise consisting of six sequels, a television series, a crossover with the Friday the 13th franchise, various other merchandise, and a 2010 remake. The film was followed by A Nightmare on Elm Street 2: Freddy's Revenge (1985).

== Plot ==
Teenager Tina Gray awakens from a terrifying nightmare in which a disfigured man wearing a bladed glove attacks her in a boiler room. Her mother points out the mysterious slashes on her nightgown. The following morning, Tina's best friend Nancy Thompson and Nancy's boyfriend, Glen Lantz, divulge that they too had nightmares about the same disfigured man. During a sleepover at Tina's house, Tina's boyfriend, Rod Lane, arrives, and they have sex. When Tina falls asleep, she dreams of the disfigured man attacking her, while Rod sees her fatally slashed by an unseen force, causing him to flee. Nancy and Glen find Tina's bloodied corpse.

The next day, Nancy's policeman father, Don Thompson, arrests Rod despite his pleas of innocence. At school, Nancy falls asleep in class and dreams of the man chasing her in a boiler room. She deliberately burns her arm on a pipe, which startles her awake in class, and leaves a burn mark on her forearm. Nancy visits Rod at the police station, where he describes Tina's death along with his own recent nightmares about the same man.

At home, Nancy falls asleep in the bathtub and is nearly drowned by the man. She then relies on caffeine to stay awake and invites Glen to watch over her as she sleeps. In her nightmare, Nancy watches the man preparing to kill Rod in his cell, but he turns his attention toward her and attacks her. Nancy wakes up when her alarm clock goes off. The man kills Rod, staging it as a suicide. At his funeral, Nancy's parents grow worried when she describes her nightmares. Her mother, Marge, drives her to a sleep disorder clinic where, in a nightmare, Nancy grabs the man's fedora with the name "Fred Krueger" written in it and pulls it into the real world.

After barricading their house, Marge discloses to Nancy that Krueger was a child murderer who killed 20 children but was released on a technicality. He was then burned alive by the victims' parents, alongside other Elm Street residents, who sought vigilante justice. Marge then showcases Krueger's bladed glove concealed in their furnace, and Nancy realizes that Krueger targeted her and her friends because their parents were accomplices to his homicide.

Later that night, Glen falls asleep and is killed by Krueger. Nancy asks Don, who is across the street investigating Glen's murder site, to break into their house in 20 minutes. She rigs booby traps and successfully lures Krueger out of her nightmare and into the real world. The booby traps allow her to light him on fire and lock him in the basement.

The police arrive to find that Krueger has escaped from the basement. Nancy and Don find a burning Krueger smothering Marge in her bedroom. After Don extinguishes the fire, Krueger and Marge vanish into the bed before Krueger rises behind Nancy. Realizing that Krueger is fueled by his victims' fear, she calmly turns her back to him, and Krueger evaporates.

Nancy steps outside into a foggy morning where all her friends and her mother are still alive. She gets into Glen's convertible to go to school when the top suddenly comes down (colored in green and red stripes), locking them in as the car speeds down the street and Marge waves them goodbye on her doorstep. Three girls in white dresses playing jump rope chant Krueger's nursery rhyme while Marge is grabbed by Krueger through the front door window.

== Cast ==
- Heather Langenkamp as Nancy Thompson
- Robert Englund as Fred "Freddy" Krueger (Note: Robert Englund is credited as "Fred" rather than "Freddy" in this film.; The hands of Freddy forging his iconic glove in the intro scenes are not Englund's, but Charles Belardinelli's.)
- Johnny Depp as Glen Lantz
- Ronee Blakley as Marge Thompson
- John Saxon as Lt. Donald "Don" Thompson
- Amanda Wyss as Christina "Tina" Gray
- Nick Corri as Rod Lane
- Joseph Whipp as Sgt. Parker
- Charles Fleischer as Dr. King
- Lin Shaye as Teacher
- Leslie Hoffman as Hall Guard
- Mimi Craven as Nurse
- Jack Shea as Minister
- Ed Call as Mr. Lantz
- Sandy Lipton as Mrs. Lantz
- David Andrews as Foreman
- Jeff Levine as Coroner
- Donna Woodrum as Mrs. Gray
- Paul Grenier as Mrs. Gray's boyfriend
- Ash Adams and Don Hannah as Surfers
- Shashawnee Hall, Brian Reise and Carol Pritikin as Cops
- Kathi Gibbs, John Richard Peterson, Chris Tashima and Antonia Yannouli as Kids (uncredited)

Robert Shaye has two uncredited roles as broadcasters for local television news and KRGR Radio station.

Make-up artist David B. Miller designed Krueger's disfigured face based on photographs of burn victims obtained from the UCLA Medical Center.

== Production ==
=== Development ===
A Nightmare on Elm Street contains many biographical elements from director Wes Craven's childhood. The film was inspired by several newspaper articles printed in the Los Angeles Times in the 1970s about Hmong refugees, who, after fleeing to the United States because of war and genocide in Laos, Cambodia, and Vietnam, suffered disturbing nightmares and refused to sleep. Some of the men died in their sleep soon after. Medical authorities called the phenomenon Asian Death Syndrome. The condition afflicted men between the ages of 19 and 57 and was believed to be sudden unexplained death syndrome or Brugada syndrome or both. Craven stated, "It was a series of articles in the LA Times; three small articles about men from South East Asia, who were from immigrant families and had died in the middle of nightmares—and the paper never correlated them, never said, 'Hey, we've had another story like this.'" The 1970s pop song "Dream Weaver" by Gary Wright sealed the story for Craven, giving him not only an artistic setting to jump off from, but a synthesizer riff for the movie soundtrack. Craven has also stated that he drew some inspiration for the film from Eastern religions.

Other sources attribute the inspiration for the film to be a 1968 student film project made by Craven's students at Clarkson University. The student film parodied contemporary horror films, and was filmed along Elm Street in Potsdam, New York.

Freddy Krueger, the film's villain, is drawn from Craven's early life. One night, a young Craven saw an elderly man walking on the sidepath outside the window of his home. The man stopped to glance at a startled Craven and walked off. This served as the inspiration for Krueger. Initially, Fred Krueger was intended to be a child molester, but Craven eventually characterized him as a child murderer to avoid being accused of exploiting a spate of highly publicized child molestation cases that occurred in California around the time of the film's production. On Freddy's nature, Craven states that "in a sense, Freddy stands for the worst of parenthood and adulthood—the dirty old man, the nasty father and the adult who wants children to die rather than help them prosper. He's the boogey man and the worst fear of children—the adult that's out to get them. He's a very primal figure, sort of like Kronos devouring his children—that evil, twisted, perverted father figure that wants to destroy and is able to get them at their most vulnerable moment, which is when they're asleep!"

By Craven's account, his own adolescent experiences led him to the name Freddy Krueger; he had been bullied at school by a child named Fred Krueger. Craven had done the same thing in his film The Last House on the Left (1972), where the villain's name was shortened to Krug. Craven chose to make Krueger's sweater red and green after reading an article in a 1982 Scientific American that said these two colors were the most clashing colors to the human retina.

Craven strove to make Krueger different from other horror film villains of the era. In 2014, he recalled, "A lot of the killers were wearing masks: Leatherface, Michael Myers, Jason. I wanted my villain to have a mask, but be able to talk and taunt and threaten. So I thought of him being burned and scarred." He also said the killer should use something other than a knife because it was too common. "So I thought, 'How about a glove with steak knives?' I gave the idea to our special effects guy, Jim Doyle." Ultimately two models of the glove were built: the hero glove that was only used whenever anything needed to be cut, and the stunt glove that was less likely to cause injury. For a time, Craven had considered a sickle as the weapon of choice for the killer, but around the third or fourth drafts of the script, the iconic glove had become his final choice.

=== Writing ===
Wes Craven began writing the screenplay for A Nightmare on Elm Street around 1981, after he had finished production on Swamp Thing (1982). He pitched it to several studios, but each one of them rejected it for different reasons. The first studio to show interest was Walt Disney Productions, although they wanted Craven to tone down the content to make it suitable for children and preteens as a family-friendly PG-13 film; Craven declined. Another studio Craven pitched to was Paramount Pictures, which passed on the project due to its similarity to Dreamscape (1984). Universal Studios also passed; Craven, who was in desperate personal and financial straits during this period, later framed the company's rejection letter on the wall of his office, which reads in its December 14, 1982 print: "We have reviewed the script you have submitted, A Nightmare on Elm Street. Unfortunately, the script did not receive an enthusiastic enough response from us to go forward at this time. However, when you have a finished print, please get in touch and we would be delighted to screen it for a possible negative pick up."

Finally, the fledgling and independent New Line Cinema corporation, which had up to that point only distributed films, agreed to produce the film. During filming, New Line's distribution deal for the film fell through and, for two weeks, it was unable to pay its cast and crew. Although New Line has gone on to make bigger and more profitable films, A Nightmare on Elm Street was its first commercial success and the studio is often referred to as "The House That Freddy Built".

New Line Cinema lacked the financial resources for the production themselves and so had to turn to external financiers. They found two investors in England who each contributed 40% and 30%, respectively, to the necessary funds; one of the producers of The Texas Chain Saw Massacre contributed 10%, and home video distributor Media Home Entertainment contributed 20% of the original budget. Four weeks before production began, the English investor who had contributed 40% backed out, but Media Home Entertainment added in another 40% to the budget. Among the backers were also Heron Communications and Smart Egg Pictures. According to producer Robert Shaye, all the film's original investors backed out at one point or another during pre-production. The original budget was $700,000. "It ended up at $1.1 million ... half the funding came from a Yugoslavian guy (Note: The "Yugoslavian guy" mentioned is Djordje (George) Zecevic, Serbian founder of Smart Egg Pictures .) who had a girlfriend he wanted in movies."

=== Casting ===
==== Freddy ====
“I looked at hundreds of guys and a lot of old men. I wanted somebody that was very agile. I learned from making films like The Hills Have Eyes that it wasn't the bigness of the villain that paid off, it was the evil he was able to transmit as an actor. I wanted somebody who was an actor rather than a stuntman, somebody who could convey a sense of evil and who was very enthusiastic about getting to an evil state. You really have to get malicious and malevolent and a lot of actors just don't want to get there; their heart isn't in it. You have to find somebody who is comfortable with that idea and isn't threatened by it; he knows it isn't him, but can go there. Robert Englund filled the bill after we found him quite late in the casting. His delight with it is that he had been playing nebishes and good guys and was looking forward to playing somebody older and evil.”

— Wes Craven on the casting of Robert Englund

Actor David Warner was originally cast to play Freddy. Make-up tests were done, but he had to drop out due to scheduling conflicts. Replacing him was difficult at first. Kane Hodder, who would later be best known for playing fellow slasher icon Jason Voorhees, was among those who Wes Craven talked with about the role of Freddy. According to Hodder, "I had a meeting with Wes Craven about playing a character he was developing called Freddy Krueger. At the time, Wes wasn't sure what kind of person he wanted for the role of Freddy, so I had as good a shot as anybody else. He was initially thinking of a big guy for the part, and he was also thinking of somebody who had real burn scars. But obviously, he changed his whole line of thinking and went with Robert Englund, who's smaller. I would have loved to play the part, but I do think Wes made the right choice". Hodder would in a way eventually play Freddy, as the hand that grabs Jason's mask at the epilogue in Jason Goes to Hell: The Final Friday (1993). Wes Craven explains that:

"I couldn't find an actor to play Freddy Krueger with the sense of ferocity I was seeking", Craven recalled on the film's 30th anniversary. "Everyone was too quiet, too compassionate towards children. Then Robert Englund auditioned. [He] wasn't as tall I'd hoped, and he had baby fat on his face, but he impressed me with his willingness to go to the dark places in his mind. Robert understood Freddy."

Englund has stated that Craven was indeed in search of a "big, giant man" originally, but casting director Annette Benson had talked Craven into seeing him about the role after Englund had auditioned for National Lampoon's Class Reunion (1982) previously. Before Englund's agent at the time, Joe Rice, sent him to the casting office, Rice's friend Rhet Topham recommended Englund to act "rat-like", "weasel-like", adding that "When we read about abusers and molesters in the newspaper, they're not big, hulking men, but weasels. I thought he should go in and play it like that. And it worked!" Englund had darkened his lower eyelids with cigarette ash on his way to the audition and slicked his hair back. "I looked strange. I sat there and listened to Wes talk. He was tall and preppy and erudite. I posed a bit, like Klaus Kinski, and that was the audition," he said later. He took the part because it was the only project that fit his schedule during the hiatus between the V miniseries and series.

==== Nancy ====
Craven said he wanted someone very non-Hollywood for the role of Nancy and he believed Heather Langenkamp met this quality. Langenkamp, who had appeared in several commercials and a TV film, had taken time off from her studies at Stanford to continue acting. Eventually she landed the role of Nancy Thompson after an open audition, beating out more than 200 actresses. Langenkamp was already known to Anette Benson as she had auditioned for Night of the Comet and The Last Starfighter previously, losing out to Catherine Mary Stewart at both occasions. Demi Moore, Courteney Cox, Tracey Gold, and Jennifer Grey have all been rumoured to have auditioned for A Nightmare on Elm Street, but Benson definitely ruled out Moore and Cox while also being unsure of Gold and Grey. Langenkamp returned as Nancy in A Nightmare on Elm Street 3: Dream Warriors (1987), and also played a fictionalized version of herself in Wes Craven's New Nightmare (1994).

There were no separate auditions for the characters of Tina and Nancy; all actresses who auditioned for one of the two female roles read for the role of Nancy, and upon potentially being called back, were mixed with other actresses trying to find a pair that had chemistry. Amanda Wyss was among those switched to Tina after a callback. Wes Craven decided immediately upon mixing Wyss and Langenkamp that this was the duo he wanted. Craven then mixed the duo with auditioners for the male teenage roles trying to find actors who had chemistry with Wyss and/or Langenkamp.

==== Glen ====
Johnny Depp was another unknown when he was cast, initially accompanying his friend (Jackie Earle Haley who went on to play Freddy in the 2010 remake) to an audition. According to Depp, the role of Glen was originally written as a "big, blond, beach-jock, football-player guy", far from his own appearance. Depp was initially rejected after bombing his audition and they went on to discuss with other actors for the part, but Wes Craven's daughters picked Depp's headshot from the set he showed them. Depp got his own nod in a cameo role in Freddy's Dead: The Final Nightmare as a man on TV and later in the Freddy vs. Jason intro, in clips from earlier films. Charlie Sheen was considered for the role but allegedly wanted too much money. Anette Benson states that they did in fact offer the part to Sheen but he passed on it due to his agent demanding twice the weekly wage of $1,142 for Sheen, which New Line Cinema did not consider themselves to have the budget for. Sheen himself objects to the sentiment that he turned down the role for the reason of money, saying:

I didn't price myself out of it because I didn't get greedy until years later. That came much later. I just didn't get it, and I've never been more wrong about interpreting a script ... I just didn't get it completely, but I still took a meeting with Wes. And when I met him, I said, "Look, with all due respect, and as a fan of your talents, I just don't see this guy wearing a funny hat with a rotted face and a striped sweater and a bunch of clacky fingers. I just don't see this catching on."

Mark Patton, who would later be cast as Jesse Walsh in the sequel, auditioned for the role of Glen Lantz and claimed that the auditioners had been winnowed down to him and Johnny Depp before Depp got the role. Other actors like John Cusack, Jon Cryer, Brad Pitt, Kiefer Sutherland, Nicolas Cage, and C. Thomas Howell have been mentioned over the years, but Anette Benson has failed to definitely recall those actors as having been among the auditioners. Though Cage had probably not auditioned for A Nightmare on Elm Street, he was in fact involved in introducing Johnny Depp to acting, through Cage's own agent who introduced Benson to him, resulting in an audition for the film.

=== Filming ===
Principal photography began on June 11, 1984, and lasted a total of 32 days, in and around Los Angeles, California. The high school the protagonists attend was filmed at John Marshall High School, where many other productions such as Grease and Pretty in Pink have been filmed. The fictional street address of Nancy's house in the film is 1428 Elm Street; in real life, this house is a private home located in Los Angeles at 1428 North Genesee Avenue. The Lantzes' family home was at 1419 North Genesee Avenue on the other side of the road. The boiler room scenes and police station interior were shot in the Lincoln Heights Jail (closed since 1965) building, while the exterior used for the police station was Cahuenga Branch Library. Rod's burial was filmed at Evergreen Cemetery. The American Jewish University on 15600 Mulholland Drive was used for the Katja Institute for the Study of Sleep Disorders visited by Marge and Nancy.

During production, over 500 gallons of fake blood were used for special effects production. For the blood geyser sequence, the filmmakers used the same revolving room set that was used for Tina's death. While filming the scenes, the cameraman and Craven himself were mounted in fixed seats taken from a Datsun B-210 car while the set rotated. The film crew inverted the set and attached the camera so that it looked like the room was right side up, then they poured the red water into the room. They used dyed water because the special effects blood did not have the right look for a geyser. During filming of this scene, the red water poured out in an unexpected way and caused the rotating room to spin. Much of the water spilled out of the bedroom window covering Craven and Langenkamp. Earth's gravity was also used to film another take for the TV version in which a skeleton shoots out from the hollowed out bed and smashes into the "ceiling".

More work was done for Freddy's boiler room than made it into the film; the film crew constructed a whole sleeping place for Freddy, showing that he was quite a hobo, an outcast and reject from society, living and sleeping where he worked, and surrounding himself with naked Barbie dolls and other things as a showcase of his fantasies and perversions. This place was supposed to be where he forged his glove and abducted and murdered his victims.

The scene where Nancy is attacked by Krueger in her bathtub was accomplished with a special bottomless tub. The tub was put in a bathroom set that was built over a swimming pool. During the underwater sequence, Heather Langenkamp was replaced with a stuntwoman. The melting staircase in Nancy's dream was Robert Shaye's idea based on his own nightmares; it was created using pancake mix. The film's special effects artist Jim Doyle portrayed Freddy on the scene where his face and hands that stretch through the wall and reach out for Nancy when she dreams; the wall was built by Doyle out of spandex.

In the scene where Freddy walks through the prison bars to threaten Rod as seen by Nancy, Wes Craven explains that, "we took triangulations of the camera so we knew exactly the height of it from the floor and the angle towards the point where the killer was going to walk through", and then "we put the camera again at the exact height and walked the actor through that space. Then those two images were married and a rotoscope artist went through and matted out the bars so it appeared they were going straight through his body." Jsu Garcia, who was cast as Rod and credited as Nick Corri, says the production was difficult for him. He was dealing with depression due to recent homelessness by snorting heroin in the bathroom between takes. In 2014, he revealed that he was high on heroin during the scene with Langenkamp in the jail cell. "His eyes were watery and they weren't focused," Langenkamp said. "I thought, 'Wow, he's giving the best performance of his life.'"

Craven said in a 2014 interview that twelve frames of blood had to be cut during Tina's death scene or the film would have been axed.

Following Tina's death, Nancy repeatedly dreams of an animate corpse of Tina in a translucent body bag. During the scene in which Freddy kills Rod in the prison cell, Nancy witnesses a centipede crawl out of Tina's mouth. The filmmakers initially attempted to achieve this effect by having Wyss force a rubber centipede out of her mouth; the effect seen in the final film was accomplished by having an actual centipede crawl out of the mouth of a clay sculpture of Wyss's likeness, sculpted by David B. Miller. During filming, the centipede was temporarily lost on set before being found again.

About halfway through the film, when Nancy is trying to stay awake, a scene from Sam Raimi's The Evil Dead appears on a television. Craven decided to include the scene because Raimi had featured a Hills Have Eyes (Craven, 1977) poster in The Evil Dead. In return, Raimi featured a Freddy Krueger glove in the workshed scene of Evil Dead II, and later in Ash vs Evil Dead.

Sean Cunningham, with whom Wes Craven had previously worked while filming The Last House on the Left (1972), helped Craven at the end of the shooting, heading the second film unit during the filming of some of Nancy's dream scenes.

Craven originally planned for the film to have a more evocative ending: Nancy kills Krueger by ceasing to believe in him, then awakens to discover that everything that happened in the film was an elongated nightmare. However, New Line head Robert Shaye demanded a twist ending, in which Krueger disappears and all seems to have been a dream, only for the audience to discover that it was a dream-within-a-dream-within-a-dream. According to Craven,

The original ending of the script has Nancy come out the door. It's an unusually cloudy and foggy day. A car pulls up with her dead friends in it. She's startled. She goes out and gets in the car wondering what the hell is going on, and they drive off into the fog, with the mother left standing on the doorstep and that's it. It was very brief, and suggestive that maybe life is sort of dream-like too. Shaye wanted Freddy Krueger to be driving the car, and have the kids screaming. It all became very negative. I felt a philosophical tension to my ending. Shaye said, "That's so 60s, it's stupid." I refused to have Freddy in the driver's seat, and we thought up about five different endings. The one we used, with Freddy pulling the mother through the doorway amused us all so much, we couldn't not use it.

Craven explains that the effect of the mentioned fog did not work out for the team and they had to film without it: there were around 20 persons with fog machines, but the breeze at the time was too much, and the fog was gone before they had the opportunity to film the intendedly foggy scene. Though several variants of an end scene were considered and filmed, Heather Langenkamp states that "there always was this sense that Freddy was the car", while according to Sara Risher, "it was always Wes' idea to pan to the little girls' jumping rope". Both a happy ending and a twist ending were filmed, but the final film used the twist ending. As a result, Craven who never wanted the film to be an ongoing franchise, did not work on the first sequel, Freddy's Revenge (1985). Filming wrapped at the end of July, and the film was rushed to get ready for its November release.

== Music ==
A Nightmare on Elm Street (Original Motion Picture Soundtrack)

Soundtrack album by Charles Bernstein
- Released: 1984
- Genres: Electronic, film score
- Length: 33:32
- Label: Varèse Sarabande
- Producer: Charles Bernstein

Charles Bernstein chronology
Love at First Bite (1979)	A Nightmare on Elm Street (Original Motion Picture Soundtrack) (1984)	April Fool's Day (1986)

Professional ratings
Review scores
Source	Rating
AllMusic	3.5/5 stars
Starburst Magazine	9/10 stars

The film score was written by composer Charles Bernstein and first released in 1984 on label Varèse Sarabande. The label re-released the soundtrack in 2015 in an 8-CD box for the franchise soundtracks excluding the remake and again in 2016 in the 12-CD box Little Box of Horror with various other horror film scores. Bernstein's film score was also re-released in 2017, along with the soundtracks of the first seven films, on the label Death Waltz Recording Company in another 8-LP vinyl box set named A Nightmare On Elm Street: Box Of Souls. In 2017 and 2019, the label also released standalone extended versions of the soundtrack with many snippets that were left out of the original releases.

=== Freddy's theme song ===
The lyrics for Freddy's theme song, sung by the jumprope children throughout the series and based on "One, Two, Buckle My Shoe", was already written and included in the script when Bernstein started writing the soundtrack, while the melody for it was not set by Bernstein, but by Heather Langenkamp's boyfriend and soon-to-be husband at the time, Alan Pasqua, who was a musician himself. Bernstein integrated Pasqua's contribution into his soundtrack as he saw fit. One of the three girls who recorded the vocal part of the theme was Robert Shaye's then-14-year-old daughter.

== Themes ==
Freddy exclusively attacks teenagers and his actions have been interpreted as symbolic of the often traumatic experiences of adolescence. Nancy, like the archetypal teenager, experiences social anxiety and her relationship with her parents becomes strained. Sexuality is present in Freudian images and is almost exclusively displayed in a threatening and mysterious context (e.g., Tina's death is evocative of rape, Freddy's glove between Nancy's legs in the bath). The original script called for Krueger to be a child molester, rather than a child murderer, before being murdered.

Wes Craven has explained that "the notion of the screenplay is that the sins of the parents are visited upon the children, but the fact that each child is not necessarily stuck with their lot is still there." Robert Englund observes that "in Nightmare, all the adults are damaged: They're alcoholic, they're on pills, they're not around". Blakley says the parents in the film "verge on being villains." Englund adds: "the adolescents have to wade through that, and Heather is the last girl standing. She lives. She defeats Freddy." Langenkamp agrees: "Nightmare is a feminist movie, but I look at it more as a 'youth power' film."

== Release ==
=== Censorship issues ===
When the film was submitted to the Motion Picture Association of America film rating system (MPAA), they required two cuts to grant it an R rating. The theatrical version was released with an R rating and thirteen seconds of cuts. In the United Kingdom, the film was released theatrically and on home video uncut. The Australian theatrical release was edited to an M rating, but the VHS home video was released uncut in 1985 with an Australian R rating. The uncut version did not see a release in the United States until the 1996 Elite Entertainment Laserdisc release. All DVD, digital, and Blu-ray releases use the R-rated theatrical version; the uncut version was not released on a digital format until 2024, though six seconds had previously been restored for home video and a further two seconds for subsequent releases (which the Ultra HD Blu-ray release did not involve with Media Home Entertainment and Smart Egg Pictures).

=== Theatrical ===
A Nightmare on Elm Street was released in the United States through New Line Cinema on November 9, 1984, and in the United Kingdom through Palace Pictures on August 30, 1985.

=== Home media ===
The film was first introduced to the home video market by Media Home Entertainment in early 1985, and was eventually released on LaserDisc. It initially earned $8 million from sale of the videos. It has since been released on DVD, first in 1999 in the United States as part of the Nightmare on Elm Street Collection box set (along with the other six sequels), and once again in a restored Infinifilm special edition in 2006, containing various special features with contributions from Wes Craven, Heather Langenkamp, John Saxon and director of photography Jacques Haitkin.

The special edition consisted of two DVDs, one with the film picture and sound restored (DTS 5.1, Dolby Digital 5.1, and original mono audio track) and another DVD with special features. Along with the restored version of the film, Disc One also had two commentaries, and other nightmares (if not all) from the film's sequels (two through seven and Freddy Vs. Jason). It also included additional, extended or alternate scenes of the film, such as one scene where Marge reveals to Nancy that she had another sibling who was killed by Freddy. These unused clips and scenes were not included or added to the DVD film but could be viewed separately from the DVD's menus.

On April 13, 2010, the film was released on Blu-ray Disc by Warner Home Video, with all the same extras from the 2006 special edition; a DVD box set containing all of the films up to that point was released on the same day. In conjunction with the film's fortieth anniversary, Warner released the film on 4K and Ultra-HD Blu-ray on October 15, 2024.

== Reception ==
=== Box office ===
A Nightmare on Elm Street premiered in the United States with a limited theatrical release on November 9, 1984, opening in 165 cinemas across the country. Grossing $1,271,000 during its opening weekend, the film was considered an instant commercial success. The film eventually earned a total of $25,504,513 at the US and Canadian box office and $57 million worldwide.

=== Critical response ===
==== Contemporaneous ====
In a contemporary review, Kim Newman wrote in the Monthly Film Bulletin that A Nightmare on Elm Street was closer to a Stephen King adaptation with its small-town setting, and "invented monster myth". Newman concluded that the film found "Craven emerging from his recent career slump (Swamp Thing, The Hills Have Eyes Part 2, Invitation to Hell) with a fine, perhaps definitive bogeyman to back him up" and that the film was "a superior example of an over-worked genre". Paul Attanasio of The Washington Post praised the film, stating that "for such a low-budget movie, Nightmare on Elm Street is extraordinarily polished. The script is consistently witty, the camera work (by cinematographer Jacques Haitkin) is crisp and expressive." The review noted that "the genre has built-in limitations... but Craven faces the challenge admirably; A Nightmare on Elm Street is halfway between an exploitation flick and classic surrealism". The review also commented on Freddy Krueger, calling him "the most chilling figure in the genre since 'The Shape' made his debut in Halloween." Variety commented that the film was "a highly imaginative horror film", praising the special effects while finding that the film "fails to tie up his thematic threads satisfyingly at the conclusion."

The review commented negatively on some of the scenes involving Nancy's family, noting that "the movie's worst scenes involve Nancy and her alcoholic mother". On the character development, Newman stated that "the impression that about two hundred pages worth of characterisation has been compressed into cliché details like boozy Ronee Blakley demonstrating her renewed self-respect by throwing away a half-full bottle." Newman also said that the nightmares in the film worked against itself, stating that "while the kissing telephone and bottomless bathtub are disorienting in the [David] Cronenberg spirit, they get in the way of the relentless, pursuing-monster aspect that Carpenter manages so well."

==== Retrospective ====
Author Ian Conrich praised the film's ability to rupture "the boundaries between the imaginary and real", and critic James Berardinelli said it toys with audience perceptions. Kelly Bulkeley interpreted the overriding theme as a social subtext, "the struggles of adolescents in American society".

The film has a 93% approval rating based on 71 reviews on Rotten Tomatoes with an average rating of 7.8/10 and with the site's consensus saying: "Wes Craven's intelligent premise, combined with the horrifying visual appearance of Freddy Krueger, still causes nightmares to this day." The film is also considered one of the best of 1984 by Filmsite.org. In 2010, the Independent Film & Television Alliance selected the film as one of the 30 most significant independent films of the past 30 years. It ranked at number 17 on Bravo's 100 Scariest Movie Moments (2004)—a five-hour program that selected cinema's scariest moments. In 2008, Empire ranked A Nightmare on Elm Street 162nd on their list of the 500 greatest movies of all time. It also was selected by The New York Times as one of the best 1000 movies ever made.

American Film Institute recognition

- AFI's 100 Years...100 Heroes and Villains – #40, Freddy Krueger, Villain

=== Accolades ===
- Academy of Science Fiction, Fantasy & Horror Films – Best Horror Film (1985) (nomination)
- Academy of Science Fiction, Fantasy & Horror Films – Best Performance by a Young Actor – Jsu Garcia (1985) (nomination)
- Academy of Science Fiction, Fantasy & Horror Films – Best DVD Classic Film Release (2007) (nomination)
- Avoriaz Fantastic Film Festival – Critics Award – Wes Craven (1985) (winner)
- Avoriaz Fantastic Film Festival – Special Mention for Acting – Heather Langenkamp (1985) (winner)

== Other media ==
Concept art of the planned, never finished or released comic book adaption of the 1984 film, illustrating one of Nancy's struggles with Freddy. Art by Andy Mangels.

=== Literature ===
A joint novelization of the 1984 film and the sequels Freddy's Revenge and Dream Warriors was released in 1987, written by Jeffrey Cooper. An eight part comic book adaption of the films and Freddy's Nightmares in 3D was commissioned in early 1989 to be published by Blackthorne Publishing and were to be written by Andy Mangels; these plans fell apart quickly due to the collapse and bankruptcy of said publisher throughout later 1989 and 1990. Some lost concept art was finished of this planned comic book adaption before the folding of Blackthorne; Mangels explains that "Blackthorne had the 3-D rights, but they went bankrupt after I had written three issues, one had been pencilled, and none had been published". A 3D comic book adaption written by Mangels would eventually be released of the fifth sequel Freddy's Dead: The Final Nightmare on Innovation Publishing.

Cinematic derivatives of A Nightmare on Elm Street (1984) includes the two separate Bollywood horror films Khooni Murda (1989) and Mahakaal (1993), the Indonesian horror film Satan's Bed (Batas Impian Ranjang Setan; 1986) and the American pornographic parody film named A Wet Dream on Elm Street (2011).

=== Remake ===
In 2010, a remake was released, also titled A Nightmare on Elm Street, starring Jackie Earle Haley as Freddy Krueger. The film was produced by Michael Bay, directed by Samuel Bayer, and written by the team of Wesley Strick and Eric Heisserer. The film was intended as a reboot to the franchise, but plans for a sequel never came to fruition after the film received mostly negative reviews despite being a financial success.

On August 7, 2015, it was reported that New Line Cinema was developing a second remake with Orphan writer David Leslie Johnson. Englund expressed interest in returning to the series in a cameo role. Leslie Johnson later added that the work is in limbo due to the success of The Conjuring Universe, saying that "Nothing is percolating just yet", and "Everybody wants to see Freddy again I think, so I think it's inevitable at some point".

== See also ==
- List of ghost films
- List of monster movies

== Bibliography ==
- Hutson, Tommy (2016). Never Sleep Again: The Elm Street Legacy: The Making of Wes Craven's A Nightmare on Elm Street. Permuted Press. ISBN 978-1-6186-8640-4.
- Badley, Linda. Film, Horror, and the Body Fantastic. Westport, Conn.: Greenwood Press, 1995. ISBN 0-313-27523-8.
- Baird, Robert. "The Startle Effect: Implications for Spectator Cognition and Media Theory". Film Quarterly 53 (No. 3, Spring 2000): pp. 12–24.
- Carroll, Noël. "The Nature of Horror." Journal of Aesthetics and Art Criticism 46 (No. 1, Autumn 1987): pp. 51–59.
- Christensen, Kyle. "The Final Girl versus Wes Craven's 'A Nightmare on Elm Street': Proposing a Stronger Model of Feminism in Slasher Horror Cinema". Studies in Popular Culture 34 (No. 1, Fall 2011): pp. 23–47.
- Cumbow, Robert C. Order in the Universe: The Films of John Carpenter. 2nd ed., Lanham, Md.: Scarcrow Press, 2000. ISBN 0-8108-3719-6.
- Johnson, Kenneth. "The Point of View of the Wandering Camera". Cinema Journal 32 (No. 2, Winter 1993): pp. 49–56.
- King, Stephen. Danse Macabre. New York: Berkley Books, 1981. ISBN 0-425-10433-8.
- Prince, Stephen, ed. The Horror Film. New Brunswick, N.J.: Rutgers University Press, 2004. ISBN 0-8135-3363-5.
- Schneider, Steven Jay, ed. Horror Film and Psychoanalysis: Freud's Worst Nightmare. Cambridge: Cambridge University Press, 2004. ISBN 0-521-82521-0.
- Williams, Tony. Hearths of Darkness: The Family in the American Horror Film. Rutherford, N.J.: Fairleigh Dickinson University Press, 1996. ISBN 0-8386-3564-4.
