= Jack Sholder =

American film and television director, screenwriter and educator

- Born: June 8, 1945 (age 81); Philadelphia, Pennsylvania, U.S.
- Occupations: Film director; Television director; Screenwriter; Film editor; Educator
- Years active: 1973–2004
- Known for: Alone in the Dark, A Nightmare on Elm Street 2: Freddy's Revenge, The Hidden

Jack Sholder (born June 8, 1945) is an American film and television director, screenwriter and educator. He is best known for directing the horror films Alone in the Dark (1982), A Nightmare on Elm Street 2: Freddy's Revenge (1985) and Wishmaster 2: Evil Never Dies (1999), as well as the science-fiction action film The Hidden (1987). His work also includes the action film Renegades (1989) and television films such as By Dawn's Early Light (1990) and 12:01 (1993).

== Early life and education ==
Sholder was born in Philadelphia, Pennsylvania. He grew up in the city's Wynnefield neighborhood and studied literature while initially considering a career in music. He later studied English literature and became interested in cinema during his college years. In interviews, he has described being influenced by French filmmaking, particularly the films of Jean Renoir, whose emphasis on characterization and social commentary he admired.

While at college, Sholder began experimenting with short films. His early projects included adaptations and original shorts, culminating in The Garden Party (1973), an adaptation of a story by Katherine Mansfield. He directed, wrote and edited the short, which featured Jessica Harper, Beatrice Straight and Tracey Walter. In a 2020 interview, Sholder contrasted that early project with the horror and action films for which he later became known.

== Career ==
=== Editing and first features ===
Following college, Sholder moved to New York City and worked as a film editor. He became associated with Robert Shaye and the then-independent distributor New Line Cinema, preparing trailers and editing material for its releases. His early credits also included work on English-language versions of foreign films, including The Tattooed Hit Man (1977), for which he received a writing credit on the English-language version.

Sholder's editing work included the slasher film The Burning (1981), directed by Tony Maylam. The American Film Institute lists him as the film's editor. His television editing credits included the educational series 3-2-1 Contact.

When New Line sought to move into producing feature films, Sholder proposed a horror story that became Alone in the Dark (1982), his feature-film directorial debut. Starring Jack Palance, Martin Landau and Donald Pleasence, the film combined horror with dark comedy. Sholder had developed its story and directed the production. He later explained that the opportunity arose partly from Shaye's familiarity with his editing work.

=== A Nightmare on Elm Street 2 and The Hidden ===
Sholder directed A Nightmare on Elm Street 2: Freddy's Revenge (1985), the sequel to Wes Craven's A Nightmare on Elm Street (1984). He initially hesitated to accept the assignment because he did not want to be confined to horror films. The sequel was commercially successful, and his work on it led to further directing offers.

The film later acquired a substantial following for its queer subtext. In a 2025 interview with TheWrap, Sholder discussed the film's subsequent interpretation by audiences and its connection with the experiences of lead actor Mark Patton. He welcomed the later reassessment while distinguishing it from the filmmakers' original intentions.

Sholder next directed The Hidden (1987), starring Kyle MacLachlan and Michael Nouri, from a screenplay by Jim Kouf credited under the pseudonym Bob Hunt. The film combines police action and science fiction. Sholder has described choosing the project because he was drawn to its script and to the opportunity to work outside the conventional slasher-film format.

Although The Hidden had only modest box-office results, it later developed a cult following. It received the Grand Prize at the 1988 Avoriaz Fantastic Film Festival, while Sholder received a best-director award at Fantasporto. The film also received recognition at the Sitges festival and a nomination for Sholder at the Saturn Awards.

Following The Hidden, Sholder directed Renegades (1989), an action crime film released by Universal Pictures. In interviews, he described moving between horror and action films rather than seeking to remain associated with one genre.

=== Television and later filmmaking ===
Sholder directed the HBO television film By Dawn's Early Light (1990), a drama concerning nuclear conflict, and 12:01 (1993), a science-fiction television film involving a time loop. He has identified both productions, along with Alone in the Dark and The Hidden, among the films of which he was particularly proud.

His television directing credits include Vietnam War Story (1988), Tales from the Crypt and Gabriel's Fire (both 1990), Natural Selection (1994), Sketch Artist II: Hands That See (1995), Generation X (1996), Runaway Car (1997), Pensacola: Wings of Gold (1997), Mortal Kombat: Conquest (1999), Tremors (2003), and 12 Days of Terror (2004).

Sholder wrote the screenplay of Where Are the Children? (1986) and later wrote and directed Wishmaster 2: Evil Never Dies (1999). He was also involved, without screen credit, in additional directing work on the science-fiction film Supernova (2000), whose credited director was Walter Hill under the name Thomas Lee. Other feature directing credits from this period include Arachnid (2001) and Beeper (2002).

Discussing his filmography in a 2012 interview for Behind the Curtain Part II, Sholder singled out Alone in the Dark, The Hidden, By Dawn's Early Light and 12:01 as personal favorites and expressed particular dissatisfaction with Arachnid. He later elaborated on his experiences making that film in a 2020 interview.

=== Teaching and retrospective interest ===
In the mid-2000s, Sholder became involved in film education at Western Carolina University in North Carolina, helping establish a film-production program and teaching filmmaking. He retired from the university in 2017. While later interviews described his academic retirement, he said in 2020 that he did not regard himself as definitively retired from filmmaking; projects he discussed at that time were not confirmed releases.

Sholder has appeared as himself in documentaries about the Nightmare on Elm Street franchise, including Never Sleep Again: The Elm Street Legacy (2010) and Scream, Queen! My Nightmare on Elm Street (2019). His involvement in interviews and retrospectives continued, including an October 2025 interview published in connection with a new home-video release of the series.

== Filmography ==
=== Film ===
Year	Film	Contribution	Notes
1973	The Garden Party	Director, writer and editor	Short film
1977	Yamaguchi-gumi gaiden: Kyushu shinko-sakusen (The Tattooed Hit Man)	English-version script	Credit listed for English-language version
1981	The Burning	Editor	Feature film directed by Tony Maylam
1982	Alone in the Dark	Director; story	Feature-film directorial debut
1985	A Nightmare on Elm Street 2: Freddy's Revenge	Director	
1986	Where Are the Children?	Screenwriter	
1987	The Hidden	Director	Written by Jim Kouf under the name Bob Hunt
1989	Renegades	Director	
1999	Wishmaster 2: Evil Never Dies	Director and writer	Direct-to-video film
2000	Supernova	Uncredited director of additional material	Main directorial credit belongs to Walter Hill (as Thomas Lee)
2001	Arachnid	Director	
2002	Beeper	Director	

=== Television films ===
Sholder directed the following television films and anthology-film segments.

Year	Title	Notes
1988	Vietnam War Story: “The Fragging”	Television anthology segment
1990	By Dawn's Early Light	Television film
1993	12:01	Television film
1994	Natural Selection	Also known as Dark Reflection
1995	Sketch Artist II: Hands That See	Television film
1996	Generation X	Television film
1997	Runaway Car	Television film
2004	12 Days of Terror	Television film

=== Television series ===
The following episode-directing credits are listed by television-credit databases.

Year	Series	Episode(s)
1990	Tales from the Crypt	Fitting Punishment
1990	Gabriel's Fire	To Catch a Con: Part 1; To Catch a Con: Part 2
1997	Pensacola: Wings of Gold	Birds of Prey
1999	Mortal Kombat: Conquest	The Serpent and the Ice
2003	Tremors	Shriek and Destroy

== Awards and recognition ==
Sholder's film The Hidden received the Grand Prize at the Avoriaz Fantastic Film Festival in 1988. He won the Best Director award at Fantasporto and the International Critics' Jury prize at the 1987 Sitges festival, and was nominated for a Saturn Award for Best Director.
