= Wes Craven's New Nightmare =

1994 film by Wes Craven

- Theatrical release poster
- Directed by: Wes Craven
- Written by: Wes Craven
- Based on: Characters by Wes Craven
- Produced by: Marianne Maddalena
- Starring: Robert Englund; Heather Langenkamp; Miko Hughes; John Saxon
- Cinematography: Mark Irwin
- Edited by: Patrick Lussier
- Music by: J. Peter Robinson
- Production company: New Line Productions
- Distributed by: New Line Cinema
- Release date: October 14, 1994
- Running time: 112 minutes
- Country: United States
- Language: English
- Budget: $8 million
- Box office: $19.8 million

Wes Craven's New Nightmare (also known simply as New Nightmare) is a 1994 American meta supernatural horror film written and directed by Wes Craven, creator of 1984's A Nightmare on Elm Street. It is the seventh installment in the A Nightmare on Elm Street franchise, portraying Freddy Krueger as a fictional movie villain who invades the real world and haunts the cast and crew involved in the making of the films about him. In the film, Freddy is depicted as closer to what Craven originally intended, being much more menacing and much less comical, with an updated attire and appearance. The film stars Robert Englund, Heather Langenkamp, Miko Hughes, and John Saxon.

The film features various people involved in the motion picture industry portraying themselves, including Langenkamp, who is compelled by events in the narrative to reprise her role as Nancy Thompson. Wes Craven's New Nightmare features several homages to the original film such as quotes and recreations of the most famous scenes. The film won an International Fantasy Film Award from Fantasporto for Best Screenplay by Craven.

Wes Craven's New Nightmare was released by New Line Cinema on October 14, 1994, grossing $19.8 million at the box office on a budget of $8 million, making it the lowest-grossing film in the A Nightmare on Elm Street series. However, it received positive reviews from critics, and is considered by many as one of the best Nightmare movies and one of Wes Craven's most enduring films. It was followed by 2003's Freddy vs. Jason, a crossover with the Friday the 13th franchise set in the same continuity as the other A Nightmare on Elm Street films.

== Plot ==
Heather Langenkamp lives in Los Angeles, California, with her husband, Chase, and their young son, Dylan. She is recognized for her role as Nancy Thompson in the A Nightmare on Elm Street film series. One night, she has a nightmare in which her family is attacked by a set of animated Freddy Krueger claws from an upcoming Nightmare film. Waking up to an earthquake, she notices a cut on Chase's finger similar to the one he had in her dream.

Heather receives frequent creepy phone calls from an obsessed fan who quotes Freddy Krueger's nursery rhyme in Freddy's voice. This coincides with a meeting with New Line Cinema, where she is asked to reprise her role as Nancy in a new Nightmare film. At home, Dylan has a traumatizing fit about Freddy. As Chase drives home from work, he falls asleep at the wheel and is slashed to death by Freddy's claws. After his funeral, Heather has another Freddy nightmare, and her friend and former co-star, John Saxon, who played her father in the films, suggests she seek medical attention for Dylan.

Dylan's health deteriorates as he becomes increasingly scared of Freddy and paranoid about going to sleep. Heather visits Nightmare creator Wes Craven, who admits to having precognitive nightmares. He explains that the films had kept an ancient supernatural entity trapped, which has been freed after the series ended with the release of Freddy's Dead: The Final Nightmare. In the guise of Freddy, the entity is focusing on Heather, its primary foe, as killing her will allow it into the real world. Heather must agree to play Nancy again to stop it. Heather catches a glimpse of Wes's script, which, inexplicably, is a written play-by-play of every dialogue and action she and everyone around her are taking. Robert Englund, who portrayed Freddy in the films, also appears to suffer nightmares and be haunted by the new Freddy, disappearing when Heather tries to contact him.

Heather takes Dylan to the hospital and returns home for his stuffed dinosaur while his babysitter, Julie, keeps watch. After Dylan falls asleep from the nurse's sedative, Freddy brutally kills Julie. Sleepwalking, Dylan leaves the hospital, and Heather chases him home as Freddy taunts them. She realizes that reality is overlapping with the films; Saxon now addresses her as Nancy and acts as Don Thompson, and her street, house, and clothes all transform into Nancy's. Once Heather embraces Nancy's role, Freddy emerges into reality and abducts Dylan to his world. Heather follows them to a hellish construct of Freddy's boiler room. After a fight, she and Dylan push Freddy into the furnace, destroying both the monster and its reality.

They emerge back into the real world from under his blankets, and Heather finds a copy of the events in Wes's screenplay. Inside is a note from Wes thanking her for defeating Freddy and playing Nancy one last time. Her victory helps imprison the entity once more.

== Cast ==
- Heather Langenkamp as herself and Nancy Thompson. Following her initial success in both the original Nightmare on Elm Street and The Dream Warriors, Langenkamp took on the role of Marie Lubbock in the ABC sitcom Just the Ten of Us. She was later stalked by an obsessed fan who was unhappy the series was cancelled, leading to her temporarily moving to England. In the film, Langenkamp's character is also stalked through harassing phone calls.
- Robert Englund as himself and The Entity / "Freddy Krueger". Englund's performance as Freddy is notably toned down in this film compared to its predecessors, with less focus on comedic quips and more on the sinister aspect of his character. The Krueger costume was also altered to become darker with more "organic" makeup and a revised glove. In the film, Englund also plays himself as both an actor and painter. According to the 2010 documentary Never Sleep Again, a scripted but ultimately unfilmed sequence would have seen Englund transformed into a fly and trapped in the web of a giant "Freddy-spider" in an homage to the 1958 film The Fly. The sequence was not shot due to time and budgetary constraints.
- Miko Hughes as Dylan Porter. Hughes plays the son of Heather Langenkamp and Chase Porter whose mental health begins to deteriorate after his encounters with Freddy.
- John Saxon as himself and Donald Thompson. Since his previous appearances in the Elm Street films, Saxon had kept himself busy primarily with lower budget movies and TV work; he was keen to appear in New Nightmare as he thought it likely to be the last film in the Elm Street saga. In the film, Saxon plays himself and gives onscreen daughter Langenkamp some advice about how to best treat her son Dylan.
- Tracy Middendorf as Julie, Dylan's babysitter and Heather's best friend. According to Middendorf in the Never Sleep Again documentary, she was created in part to act as a red herring regarding Heather's stalker. Film editor Patrick Lussier revealed in the same documentary that Julie was originally scripted to be working as an avatar for Freddy but this was ultimately changed to her being killed by him. Julie's death mimics that of Tina Grey from the original film, with a rotating room again being used to simulate Freddy dragging her across the ceiling.
- David Newsom as Chase Porter, Heather's husband and a special effects artist working for New Line Cinema. The role of Chase was originally offered to Heather Langenkamp's real life husband David LeRoy Anderson but he declined as it would be "too close to the bone". Newsom recalled in 2010 how he looked nothing like a typical special effects artist, who tended to be bigger than him with longer hair.
- Fran Bennett as Dr. Christine Heffner, who initially suspects that Heather may be inadvertently harming her child herself. Wes Craven named Bennett's character after former MPAA ratings chief Richard Heffner, with whom he had clashed many times over the content of his films.
- Wes Craven as himself. Director Craven initially scripted himself as a man driven insane by nightmares, who had cut off his own eyelids to stay awake and was being driven by Michael Berryman's character from The Hills Have Eyes. Craven decided to opt for a more comforting setting of being in an opulent house in the Hollywood Hills.
- Robert Shaye as himself. Shaye appears as himself in order to convince Heather Langenkamp to take part in the new Nightmare on Elm Street film. Shaye would later remark in the Never Sleep Again documentary, "I don't think I did a particularly good job, but I was okay". Shaye had previously appeared as a bartender at an S&M themed bar in Nightmare on Elm Street Part 2: Freddy's Revenge, as a teacher in Nightmare on Elm Street 4, as a ticket seller in Freddy's Dead and a funeral minister in the Freddy's Nightmares episode "Killer Instinct" (credited as L.E Moko).
- Marianne Maddalena as herself
- Sam Rubin as himself
- Sara Risher as herself
- Claudia Haro as a New Line Cinema receptionist
- Matt Winston and Rob LaBelle as Charles "Chuck" Wilson and Terrance "Terry" Feinstein, two special effects workers
- W. Earl Brown as Morgue attendant
- Lin Shaye as Nurse with pill. Shaye played the teacher in the original film and, according to Never Sleep Again, was pleased to return as another "generic public servant".
- Nick Corri as himself. Corri played Rod in the original film and is silently present during the funeral scene.
- Tuesday Knight as herself. Knight played Kristen Parker in the fourth film and is silently present during the funeral scene.

== Production ==
Freddy Krueger's appearance in New Nightmare was the original concept Wes Craven had for the character in A Nightmare on Elm Street (1984).

The film was written under the working title A Nightmare on Elm Street 7: The Ascension and released in 1994, the tenth-anniversary year of the original A Nightmare on Elm Street (1984). Wes Craven set out to make a deliberately more cerebral film than recent entries to the franchise—which he regarded as being cartoonish, and not faithful to his original themes. The basic premise originated when Craven first signed on to co-write Dream Warriors, but New Line Cinema rejected it then.

In New Nightmare, Krueger was portrayed closer to what Craven had imagined: darker and less comical. To reinforce this, the character's make-up and outfit were enhanced, with one of the most prominent differences being that he now wears a long blue/black trenchcoat and a green hat. In addition, the signature glove was redesigned for a more organic look, with the fingers resembling bones and having muscle textures in between. While Robert Englund again plays the character, "Freddy Krueger" is credited as "Himself" in the end credits.

While earthquake scenes were already written into the film from the beginning, production of the film happened to take place concurrently with the 1994 Northridge earthquake in Los Angeles. As such, the production team decided to incorporate real footage of the earthquake's structural damage into the film.

Craven had intended to ask Johnny Depp, whose feature film debut was in the first film, to make an appearance as himself, but was too timid to ask him. Upon running into each other after the film's release, Depp said he would have been happy to do it had Craven asked.

Craven kept most of the wardrobe from the first film as souvenirs before New Line Cinema threw them all away, and reused some of it for New Nightmare.

In the 2010 documentary Never Sleep Again: The Elm Street Legacy, New Line Cinema executive Sara Risher recalled that the production proceeded relatively smoothly compared with previous installments, attributing this to Craven's experience as a filmmaker.

New Nightmare was dedicated to Gregg Fonseca (1952–1994), who had served as production designer on the original A Nightmare on Elm Street.

== Legacy ==
In a 2014 interview with BuzzFeed, Craven discussed how the self-referential storytelling of New Nightmare influenced his approach to Scream (1996). He reflected that Scream improved upon the earlier film's concept by placing the audience, rather than the filmmakers and actors, at the centre of its self-referential narrative.

Wes Craven's New Nightmare was spoofed in 1995 by Cracked magazine in issue 28 of their horror-themed subprint "Cracked Monster Party"; in the spoof, fictionalized writers at Cracked attempts to write their own parody of the film, only to ironically end up being haunted themselves by "Ferdie", who attempts to stop them and the printing plant workers from publishing the story.

== Release ==
=== Home media ===
Wes Craven's New Nightmare was released on VHS in the United States by New Line Home Video on March 28, 1995, as documented in a contemporary release schedule published by The Washington Post.

In September 1999, New Line Home Video released a remastered A Nightmare on Elm Street collection containing the original films, available on both VHS and DVD.

In March 2013, Warner Home Video included New Nightmare in a seven-film A Nightmare on Elm Street Blu-ray collection.

On September 30, 2025, Warner Bros. Home Entertainment released the film on Ultra HD Blu-ray in the United States as part of a seven-film A Nightmare on Elm Street 4K collection, featuring a new restoration and additional bonus material.

== Reception ==
=== Box office ===
On the film's opening weekend it made $6.6 million, ranking third at the box office. It went on to gross $19.8 million worldwide, making it the poorest-performing film in the A Nightmare on Elm Street film series. In the 2010 documentary Never Sleep Again, it is suggested that the film opening against Pulp Fiction may also have damaged its potential box office.

=== Critical response ===
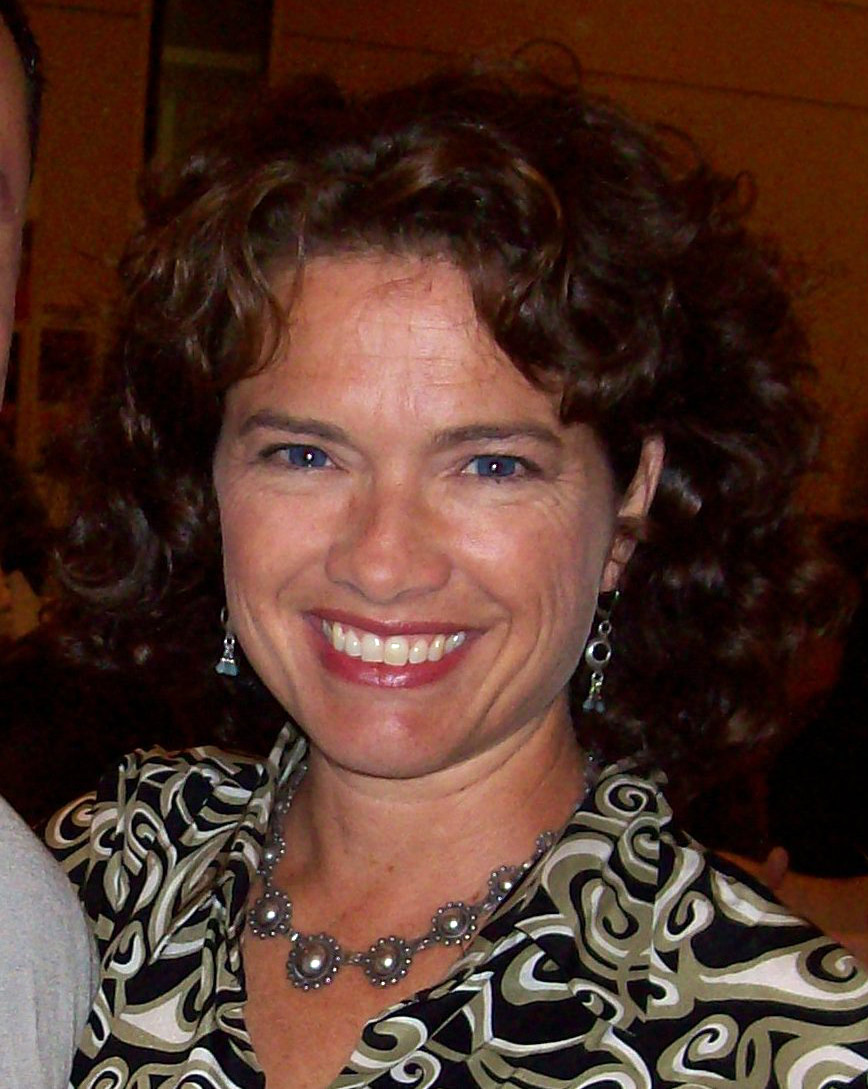
The performance of Heather Langenkamp earned praise, and it marked her final performance in the franchise. She won the Fangoria Chainsaw Award for Best Actress.

On review aggregator Rotten Tomatoes, 76% of 51 reviews are positive. The website's critics consensus reads: "Wes Craven's New Nightmare adds an unexpectedly satisfying - not to mention intelligent - meta layer to a horror franchise that had long since lost its way." On Metacritic, the film has a weighted average score of 64 out of 100 based on 21 critics, indicating "generally favorable reviews". Several critics have subsequently said that New Nightmare could be regarded as a prelude to the Scream series—both sets of films deal with the idea of bringing horror films to "real life", and both were directed by Wes Craven.

Roger Ebert of the Chicago Sun-Times gave New Nightmare three stars out of four and said, "I haven't been exactly a fan of the Nightmare series, but I found this movie, with its unsettling questions about the effect of horror on those who create it, strangely intriguing." Ebert's review partner Gene Siskel was less complimentary of the film, giving it a thumbs-down rating on Siskel & Ebert and stating that it was "campy" and he did not find Freddy a particularly compelling villain.

Entertainment Weekly's Owen Gleiberman gave New Nightmare a negative review, stating:

After a good, gory opening, in which Freddy's glove—newly designed with sinews and muscles—slashes the throat of the special-effects guy who's been working on it, the movie succumbs to a kind of sterile inertia. Wes Craven's New Nightmare isn't about Freddy haunting a film set, which actually might have been fun. It's about Heather Langenkamp, star of the original Nightmare on Elm Street, being menaced for two long, slow hours by earthquakes, cracks in the wall, and other weary portents of doom.

Gleiberman described the film as "just an empty hall of mirrors" that "lacks the trancelike dread of the original" and the "ingeniously demented special effects" of Dream Warriors. In a retrospective review, Vinnie Mancuso from Collider singled out the film as "Craven's meta-horror masterpiece". Kevin Sommerfield from the horror website Slasher Studios gave it four out of four stars and said, "New Nightmare is that rare horror film in which everything works. The performances are pitch perfect, led by a tour-de-force performance by the amazing Langenkamp. The script has many twists and turns and the movie is quite possibly the best looking of the entire series." New Nightmare is Robert Englund's favorite Nightmare movie:

"I think it stands the test of time, a fun reunion with original cast members like Heather and John Saxon. Wes's script is clever and original, the self-referencial horror story."

Heather Langenkamp also remarked of the movie:

"I was just really shocked that I was in the movie so much, I had totally forgotten I was the star of that movie. It was interesting because all my scenes are kind of alone, and I was acting against this tension and this idea of Freddy that we all had at that time. We all knew what I was afraid of and that Freddy might be back, but you never really saw Freddy that much, and I was really amazed that the movie was about Wes [Craven] creating this relationship with that idea that Freddy is here, and the audience has it too. It's a really interesting concept, and it's one of the only horror movies where the monster's really in the background, at least until the end. But it's all about our mentality about fear."

Wes Craven also felt that it finally gave Freddy his due:

When the first film opened, nobody knew what the hell it was. Once the film was out there, people began to realize that it was scary, but I still don’t think they understood how powerful the film and the message actually was. It wasn’t until years later that people realized that maybe the whole Freddy thing ought to be taken a bit more seriously and that the films represented a feeling that was actually out there. It was something that just built up over the years. People began to understand that what was going on with Freddy and the Nightmare films was, in a way, very real.

=== Accolades ===
- Nominated for Best Film - 10th Independent Spirit Awards

=== Year-end lists ===
- Top 3 "Best in-your-face exploitation" (not ranked) – Glenn Lovell, San Jose Mercury News
- Honorable mention – Howie Movshovitz, The Denver Post
- Top 18 worst (alphabetically listed, not ranked) – Michael Mills, The Palm Beach Post

== See also ==
- List of ghost films
- List of monster movies
- Postmodern horror
