= A Nightmare on Elm Street 2: Freddy's Revenge =

1985 film by Jack Sholder

- Theatrical release poster by Matthew Peak
- Directed by: Jack Sholder
- Written by: David Chaskin
- Based on: Characters by Wes Craven
- Produced by: Robert Shaye
- Starring: Mark Patton; Kim Myers; Robert Rusler; Clu Gulager; Hope Lange; Robert Englund
- Cinematography: Jacques Haitkin; Christopher Tufty
- Edited by: Bob Brady; Arline Garson
- Music by: Christopher Young
- Production companies: New Line Cinema; Heron Communications; Smart Egg Pictures
- Distributed by: New Line Cinema
- Release date: November 1, 1985
- Running time: 87 minutes
- Country: United States
- Language: English
- Budget: $3 million
- Box office: $30 million

A Nightmare on Elm Street 2: Freddy's Revenge (Note: Stylized on-screen as A Nightmare on Elm Street Part 2: Freddy's Revenge) is a 1985 American supernatural slasher film directed by Jack Sholder and written by David Chaskin. It stars Mark Patton, Kim Myers, Robert Englund as Freddy Krueger, and Robert Rusler. It is a sequel to A Nightmare on Elm Street (1984) and the second installment in the A Nightmare on Elm Street franchise. The film follows Jesse Walsh, a teenager who begins having recurring nightmares about Freddy Krueger after moving into the former home of Nancy Thompson from the franchise initial film.

Freddy's Revenge was released on November 1, 1985, and grossed $30 million at the domestic box office on a budget of $3 million. It received mixed reviews from critics upon release, with many comparing it unfavorably to its predecessor. However, it has enjoyed later success as a cult classic, with critics having reassessed the film's homoerotic themes and subject material. It was distributed by New Line Cinema. The film was followed by A Nightmare on Elm Street 3: Dream Warriors (1987).

== Plot ==
Five years after Freddy Krueger's apparent defeat, (Note: As depicted in A Nightmare on Elm Street (1984)) the Walsh family has moved into Nancy Thompson's former home. Their teenage son, Jesse, has a nightmare about Freddy. Jesse and his friend Lisa Webber discover Nancy's diary in his room, detailing her nightmares, which are strikingly similar to his. Small fires occur around the house, culminating in the spontaneous combustion of the Walshes' pet birds.

Jesse has another nightmare where Krueger tells him to kill for him. The dreams grow more intense, and he unsuccessfully attempts different measures to keep himself awake. He eventually begins wandering the streets at night. One night, he is caught by his gym teacher, Coach Schneider, in a gay bar and is made to run laps at school as punishment. In the gym showers, Freddy emerges and kills Schneider. Afterward, Jesse is horrified to see the glove on his hand. He is escorted home by the police after being found wandering the streets naked. Lisa takes Jesse to the abandoned factory where Freddy worked, but they find nothing there.

The following night, Jesse attends Lisa's pool party and kisses her, but his body begins to change, and he leaves in a panic. He goes to his friend Ron Grady's house, confesses to killing Schneider, and instructs Grady to watch him as he sleeps. When Grady falls asleep, Freddy emerges from Jesse's body and kills Grady. Freddy then changes back to Jesse, who flees to Lisa's house. Lisa realizes that Jesse's terror is giving Freddy his strength, but he cannot stop fearing him and transforms again. Freddy attacks Lisa but realizes he cannot harm her due to Jesse's influence. He goes outside instead, where he slaughters several partygoers before escaping.

Lisa drives to the abandoned factory, having to control her fear before confronting Freddy. She pleads with Jesse to fight Freddy, confesses her love for him, and kisses Freddy. After this, Jesse begins to fight back. Freddy combusts and turns to ash, from which Jesse emerges.

Later, as Jesse, Lisa, and Lisa's friend Kerry are taking the bus to school, Jesse notices similarities to his original nightmare and panics. Kerry insists it is all over before Freddy's clawed arm bursts through her chest. Freddy laughs as the bus drives into the field, just as in Jesse's first nightmare.

== Cast ==
Robert Englund as Freddy Krueger in a publicity photograph for the film

- Mark Patton as Jesse Walsh
- Kim Myers as Lisa Webber
- Robert Rusler as Ron Grady
- Clu Gulager as Ken Walsh
- Hope Lange as Cheryl Walsh
- Marshall Bell as Coach Schneider
- Melinda O. Fee as Mrs. Webber
- Tom McFadden as Mr. Webber
- Sydney Walsh as Kerry Hellman
- Robert Englund as Freddy Krueger
- Edward Blackoff as Biology Teacher
- Christie Clark as Angela Walsh
- Lyman Ward as Mr. Grady
- JoAnn Willette as Girl on Bus
- Steve Eastin as Policeman
- Brian Wimmer as Do-Gooder
- Kerry Remsen as Girlfriend
- Robert Shaye as Bartender

== Production ==
=== Development ===
Pre-production for A Nightmare on Elm Street 2 began in April 1985. Screenwriter Leslie Bohem pitched the producers with his idea of using pregnancy and possession as a plot device for the second film: "My concept was a homage to Rosemary's Baby. I came up with a plot that had a new family move into the house, a teenage boy, his pregnant mother and a stepfather the boy didn't get along with. It was a real bloody, scary idea, much more physical and realistic because the dream reality stuff was less central to these movies then. My story was more of a possession scenario with Freddy getting inside the mother's womb, controlling the fetus. But New Line passed on it because [executive] Sara Risher was pregnant at the time, and I understand the idea upset her. So they went with David Chaskin's concept instead."

Though both films ended up using the spirit possession concept, the pregnancy idea would eventually be used in the sequel A Nightmare on Elm Street 5: The Dream Child (1989), for which Bohem would write the script.

Robert Shaye offered Wes Craven the chance to direct again after helming A Nightmare on Elm Street (1984), but he turned down the offer since he had many problems with the script, such as the "possessed parakeet" that seemed very ridiculous to him, and of Freddy Krueger merging with the main character and manifesting in real life at the pool party to kill scores of teenagers of which many are bigger than him, which Craven thought would diminish Freddy's scare factor as Robert Englund is not very tall in stature. When later writing the 1987 sequel A Nightmare on Elm Street 3: Dream Warriors, Craven would ignore the events and characters of Freddy's Revenge, instead writing Dream Warriors as a direct sequel to his own 1984 film.

Jack Sholder, who had previously written and directed Alone in the Dark for New Line was offered to direct. In a 2020 interview he explained that he had "no interest in making horror films" and that his initial feeling was to turn Robert Shaye down. After realizing that A Nightmare on Elm Street Part 2: Freddy's Revenge could put him on the map as a director, he said yes.

The intro scene with Jesse Walsh's nightmare of Freddy driving the bus was carried over from the previous film; Craven was vehemently against Freddy appearing in person as the driver of the car in the epilogue scene, as he felt the storyline for Nancy Thompson (Heather Langenkamp), Tina Gray (Amanda Wyss), Rod Lane (Nick Corri) and Glen Lantz (Johnny Depp) should be self-contained in the first film. The compromise between him and Shaye was therefore to use the idea of Freddy driving the vehicle for the sequel, but not for any characters from Craven's film. The character of Lisa Webber was named Lisa Poletti in the script. On Wes Craven's suggestions, Chaskin put more emphasis on Lisa in the film than he originally intended; he explains that Craven "suggested that we shift the focus from Jesse the male lead. In the script the focus was on Jesse for 90% of the film, then suddenly it shifted to Lisa, his girlfriend. I pretty much added some focus on Lisa, and now it's like 50–50."

=== Casting ===
New Line Cinema originally thought to save money by not hiring Robert Englund to reprise his role as Freddy and instead simply use an unnamed extra in a rubber mask to play the part - as had been the case for masked, mute, impersonal killers like Jason Voorhees and Michael Myers - but reconsidered when they realized that the man had the gait and posture of "a dimestore monster" or "Frankenstein's monster" as opposed to Englund's classically trained physical acting. Footage of the extra as Freddy does appear in the film, during Coach Schneider (Marshall Bell)'s death scene in the shower, though obscured by excessive water steam. Realizing their mistake, the producers quickly brought back Englund for the rest of the film and series. Robert Shaye, head of New Line Cinema, wanted to play the role of Ron Grady's father (played in the film by Lyman Ward) but was denied by director Jack Sholder who gave him the non-speaking role of the bartender at the S&M bar that Jesse visits. Shaye would later recall in Never Sleep Again: The Elm Street Legacy that his leather outfit was purchased from Los Angeles store The Pleasure Chest.

The 2010 documentary Never Sleep Again covered the casting of the other leads- the main contenders for the role of Jesse were Mark Patton and Brad Pitt; Pitt lost the role as he was deemed 'too nice' by the producers. Mark Patton had recently received positive critical attention for his role in Come Back to the 5 & Dime, Jimmy Dean, Jimmy Dean. Both Patton and co-star Robert Rusler (who played Ron Grady) were allowed to sit in on the casting of Lisa. Kim Myers was chosen because, according to director Sholder, she looked like a young Meryl Streep.

=== Filming ===
Principal photography commenced in June 1985. Director Jack Sholder said in an interview he "had very little time to prepare" and that the movie contained "a lot of special effects, none of which I knew how to do". The film's special effects were headed by Kevin Yagher, who handled Freddy's design, and Mark Shostrom, who was responsible for the transformation effects wherein Freddy comes out of Jesse's body. David B. Miller, who created the makeup for the original film, was busy working on Cocoon and My Science Project. In a later interview, Yagher expressed disappointment and confusion regarding the ending of the film.

== Music ==
A Nightmare on Elm Street 2: Freddy's Revenge (Original Motion Picture Soundtrack)

Soundtrack album by Christopher Young
- Released: 1986
- Label: Varèse Sarabande

Professional ratings
Review scores
Source	Rating
AllMusic	3.5/5 stars

The film's score was composed by Christopher Young. The song "Have You Ever Seen a Dream Walking" performed by Bing Crosby plays over the film's end credits. The songs "Touch Me (All Night Long)" by Fonda Rae, "Whisper to a Scream" by Bobby Orlando, "On the Air Tonight" by Willy Finlayson, "Move It in the Night" by Skagarack, "You Can't Hide from the Beast Inside" by Autograph and "Terror in My Heart" by the Reds are also featured in the film.

== Reception ==
=== Box office ===
The film opened on 522 screens in the New York, Washington, D.C., Detroit and Texas areas. Varying figures have been reported for its opening weekend. Daily Variety reported it opening with $3,865,475 placing it second for the weekend behind Death Wish 3. An advert in the following day's Weekly Variety claimed it had grossed $3,220,348 placing it third behind To Live and Die in L.A. and contemporary websites such as Box Office Mojo report it grossing exactly $1 million less than the initial Daily Variety figure, with only $2.9 million, coming in fourth place. Whichever figure is used, the per screen total was higher than the other films in the top 10. The following weekend, it grossed $1,819,203 for a 10-day total of $5,569,334 (which New Line also reported in an advertisement), which indicates that the initial figure reported by Daily Variety was overstated. In the US, the film eventually made $30 million on a budget of $3 million.

=== Critical response ===
"I didn't like the second script. I thought it was a silly script. There was not a clear-cut hero who remained intact. Freddy coming out of [the hero] really violated the viewers' ability to identify with him. I suggested they make the girl across the street the hero. I thought it would have been much wiser to make her the central character. I also thought they brought Freddy much too much into the realm of reality and put him in situations where he was diminished. You want Freddy to be always threatening and overpowering. But when he's running around a swimming pool with a bunch of teenagers who are all bigger than he is, he starts to look really silly."

— Wes Craven, 1988

Critical reaction of the film was mixed upon release, with some criticism in comparison to its predecessor. Janet Maslin of The New York Times praised the film, saying that it has "clever special effects, a good leading performance and a villain so chatty he practically makes this a human-interest story". The review also gave the lead performances positive reviews, noting, "Mr. Patton and Miss Myers make likable teen-age heroes, and Mr. Englund actually turns Freddy into a welcome presence. Clu Gulager and Hope Lange have some good moments as Jesse's parents, and Marshall Bell scowls ferociously as the coach who calls his charges dirtballs and who is eventually attacked by a demonic towel." Variety gave the film a positive review saying, "Episodic treatment is punched up by an imaginative series of special effects. The standout is a grisly chest-burster setpiece." In a negative review, People called the film a "tedious, humorless mess".

On review aggregator Rotten Tomatoes the film has an approval rating of 49% based on 37 reviews. The site's critics consensus reads: "An intriguing subtext of repressed sexuality gives Freddy's Revenge some texture, but the Nightmare loses its edge in a sequel that lacks convincing performances or memorable scares." On Metacritic the film has a weighted average score of 43 out of 100 based on six critics, indicating "mixed or average" reviews.

=== Homoerotic subtext ===
Film commentators have often remarked on the film's perceived homoerotic themes, claiming its subtext suggests Jesse is a repressed homosexual. They note, in particular, the scenes where he encounters his gym teacher Coach Schneider at a fetish club, and his flight to his male friend Grady's house after he attempts to make out with his girlfriend Lisa at her pool party. Further, actor Mark Patton, who plays Jesse, played a role so often written as female in the subgenre (such as in the first film) that it has become known as the "final girl". At the time of its release, one publication referred to it as "the gayest horror film ever". In the 21st century, it has become a cult film for gay audiences. On Never Sleep Again: The Elm Street Legacy, David Chaskin refers to a 2009 list on Cracked.com which lists "The 5 Most Unintentionally Gay Horror Movies", with Freddy's Revenge as number one, and states that "There is nothing logical that can explain the level of homoeroticism in this movie".

The book Welcome to Our Nightmares: Behind the Scene with Today's Horror Actors elaborates on the film's homoerotic subtext, stating that: "The film suggested an undertone of homosexuality, starting with the protagonist's gender-neutral name. Jesse's rarely fully clothed. He and a tormentor have a sweaty wrestling match. His coach, clad in leather, basically hits on him in a gay bar, then gets killed by Freddy, including a bare-ass spanking. Freddy emerges from Jesse's stomach in the same forced-birth technique that made the Alien films legendary."

Mark Patton has claimed the film's gay subtext was increasingly emphasised through script rewrites as production progressed. "It just became undeniable" he told BuzzFeed in 2016. "I'm lying in bed and I'm a pietà and the candles are dripping and they're bending like phalluses and white wax is dripping all over. It's like I'm the center of a [...] bukkake video." He has felt betrayed since he knew the filmmakers were aware he was gay, but closeted. They had considerable leverage over him in having him perform a role that, combined with his performance as a gay teen in Come Back to the 5 & Dime, Jimmy Dean, Jimmy Dean the year before, led to him being typecast as gay. The role called attention to what he was trying to avoid discussing and would have forestalled him getting any significant roles in 1980s Hollywood.

In particular, Patton blames Chaskin, who he says claimed the subtext arose from how Patton played the part. "I love when [he] uses the word 'subtext,'" he complained. "Did you actually go to a freshman English course in high school? This is not subtext." In 2016, he said Chaskin "sabotage[d]" him. "Nobody ever affected my confidence—the boys that threw rocks at me, nobody—but this man did." Chaskin denied for years that there was a gay subtext in his screenplay. Instead, at one point, he told a reporter that Patton had simply played the part "too gay". The emotional stress of the film led Patton to leave acting shortly afterwards for a career in interior decorating.

While Chaskin has tried to reach out and apologize to Patton over the years, with limited success, he maintains that Patton's "interpretations of Jesse were choices that he made ... I have to believe that he 'got it' and that was how he decided to play it." In 2010, Chaskin finally admitted it was a deliberate choice on his part. "Homophobia was skyrocketing and I began to think about our core audience—adolescent boys—and how all of this stuff might be trickling down into their psyches," he explained. "My thought was that tapping into that angst would give an extra edge to the horror."

One scene that would have made the gay subtext more apparent was toned down. Englund was actually prepared to insert one of his hand's knife blades into Jesse's mouth instead of merely caressing his lips with it as he does in the finished film, but Patton did not feel comfortable with it. The film's makeup artist suggested to Patton that he not do the scene that way to protect his image.

In a February 2010 interview with Attitude magazine, Englund said "... the second Nightmare on Elm Street is obviously intended as a bisexual themed film. It was early '80s, pre-AIDS paranoia. Jesse's wrestling with whether to come out or not and his own sexual desires was manifested by Freddy. His friend is the object of his affection. That's all there in that film. We did it subtly but the casting of Mark Patton was intentional too, because Mark was out and had done Come Back to the Five & Dime, Jimmy Dean, Jimmy Dean."

In an article written by Brent Hartinger for AfterElton.com, he notes that a "frequent debate in gay pop culture circles is this: Just how 'gay' was 1985's A Nightmare on Elm Street 2: Freddy's Revenge (the first Elm Street sequel)? The imagery in the movie makes it seem unmistakably gay — but the filmmakers have all along denied that that was their intention." During his interview segment for the 2010 documentary film Never Sleep Again: The Elm Street Legacy, David Chaskin admitted that the gay themes were intentional, something he had denied until that point.

According to producer Sara Risher, she and the other producers including director Jack Sholder had been completely oblivious to the fact that they had unknowingly cast a closeted gay actor for their male lead role. According to Risher, all the homoerotic undertones were completely incidental and only started to become apparent in retrospective. Kim Myers had also failed to pick up on any homoerotic undertones save for with coach Schneider, having assumed Lisa and Jesse to be a traditional heterosexual love story while acting her role. In a 2020 interview Sholder said he never had any discussions with Chaskin or anybody at New Line about a gay subtext in the script during production. He did add that in his view the movie was about "repressed sexual angst that every teenager experiences" and that "that angst can express itself in the question: Am I gay?". He also pointed out that Mark Patton did not pick up on any gay subtext when he read the script, but that it was pointed out to him by one of the crew members. Sholder concluded by saying: "Looking back on it, there were a whole bunch of decisions, starting with casting Mark that really... If you look at some of the exegeses as to why it’s the gayest horror film of all time, some of it is people reading stuff into things, some of it was intentional and some of it was stuff that people added that fed into that idea."

Others in the cast and crew have said that they were unaware of any such themes at the time they made the film, but that a series of creative decisions on the part of director Jack Sholder unintentionally brought Chaskin's themes to the forefront. In an interview Sholder said, "I simply didn't have the self-awareness to realize that any of this might be interpreted as gay". Now-out Mark Patton said, "I don't think that [the character] Jesse was originally written as a gay character. I think it's something that happened along the line by serendipity". Patton also wrote Jesse's Lost Journal about Jesse's life after the film and dealing with his homosexuality.

In 2019, Patton produced and starred in the documentary film Scream, Queen! My Nightmare on Elm Street, which focuses on the legacy of Freddy's Revenge and how it affected him.

== See also ==
- List of ghost films
- List of monster movies
