= Mark Patton =

American interior designer and actor (born 1959)

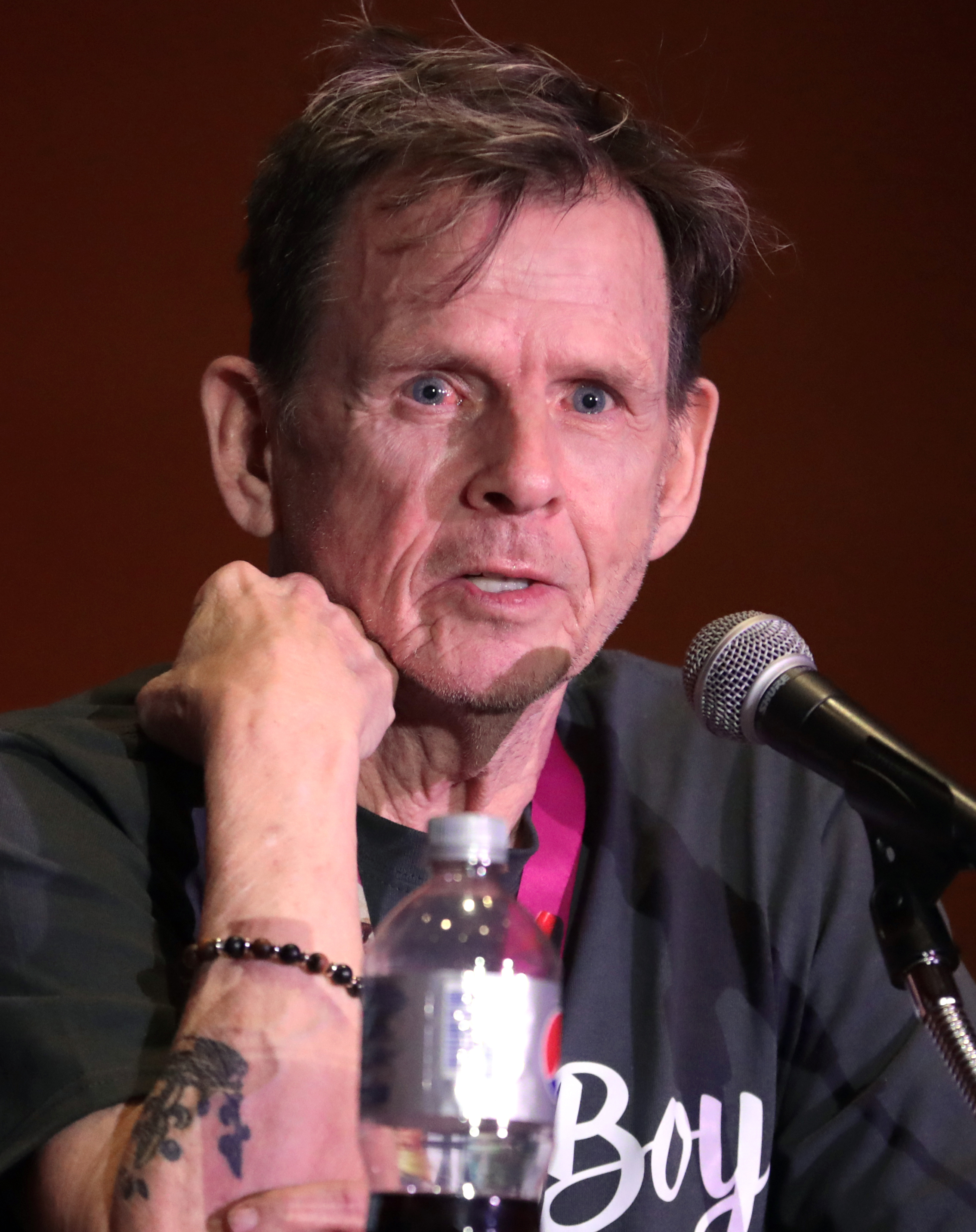
- Patton in 2023
- Born: September 22, 1959 (age 67); Kansas City, Missouri, U.S.
- Occupations: Actor, interior designer
- Years active: 1982–1986; 1999; 2015–present (as actor)
- Spouse: Hector Morales Mondragon

Mark Patton (born September 22, 1959) is an American interior designer and actor. Beginning his professional acting career in 1982, Patton is perhaps best known for his feature film roles as Joe Qualley in the dramatic film Come Back to the Five & Dime, Jimmy Dean, Jimmy Dean and as Jesse Walsh in the 1985 horror film A Nightmare on Elm Street 2: Freddy's Revenge, a role for which he is touted as the first "scream king" (male equivalent of scream queen) in modern cinema.

== Career ==
Patton grew up in Riverside, Missouri, and, after graduating from high school, moved to New York City to pursue an acting career. Within a few years, he landed the role of Joe Qualley in the 1982 Broadway production of Come Back to the Five and Dime, Jimmy Dean, Jimmy Dean. Patton reprised the role in the 1982 film of the same name. His character in the play and film was a pre-transition teen transgender woman. However, Patton was not allowed "by those guiding his career" to do an interview with the LGBTQ magazine The Advocate. Patton identified this as indicative of homophobia in Hollywood at that time.

In 1985, Patton landed the lead role in the horror film A Nightmare on Elm Street 2: Freddy's Revenge, portraying Jesse Walsh, a teen whose body becomes possessed by Freddy Krueger. Critics and audiences noted the gay subtext of the film, something screenwriter David Chaskin initially attributed to Patton's portrayal of Jesse. However, in the 2010 documentary Never Sleep Again: The Elm Street Legacy, Chaskin acknowledged that he, himself, was responsible for the film's deliberate gay subtext. The emotional stress of the film led Patton to leave acting shortly afterwards for a career in interior decorating.

In 1986, Patton made a guest appearance on the television series Hotel and had scenes alongside George Clooney and Maud Adams. He also starred in a television pilot with Chuck Connors entitled Kelsey's Son, which was never picked up. Other roles include General Hospital as Greg Collier, Misplaced with John Cameron Mitchell, Anna to the Infinite Power with Dina Merrill and Martha Byrne, and Have You Tried Talking to Patty with Heather Langenkamp.

Patton says he gave up on his acting career following being cast in a planned CBS series in which he would have played a gay character. "They began to ask me if I would be comfortable playing a gay character and telling people I was straight if they began to question my sexuality? [...] All I could think about was how everyone I knew was dying from AIDS and we were having this bullshit conversation. My heart just broke and that was the line for me. I knew I would never be able to do what they were asking, so I walked away from Hollywood and decided to move on to a place where it was totally acceptable to be gay."

Patton returned to acting for the first time since A Nightmare on Elm Street 2: Freddy's Revenge with his appearance in the 2016 horror film Family Possessions. In 2022 Patton joined fellow "A Nightmare On Elm Street" alumni Lisa Wilcox and Danny Hassel in the LGTBQ+ themed horror film "Reunion From Hell 2" marking the first time that 3 "Elm Street" alumni have ever worked on a project together that was not "Elm Street" related.

== Personal life ==
Patton was diagnosed with HIV in 1999, on his 40th birthday, after falling ill and initially being tested for bronchitis; he was subsequently hospitalized for pneumonia, thrush, and tuberculosis. In a 2013 interview, Patton said, "I almost died [in the hospital], but thankfully my friends took me to an AIDS health clinic, which saved my life." Upon recovering, he moved to Mexico, where he met and later married Hector Morales Mondragon. The couple own and operate an art store in Puerto Vallarta.

Patton appears in the A Nightmare on Elm Street documentary Never Sleep Again: The Elm Street Legacy, directed by Dan Farrands. Following his appearance in the documentary, Patton began touring horror conventions, where he is lauded as mainstream cinema's first male "scream queen". He donates most of his appearance fees to HIV treatment groups and charities benefiting LGBTQ youth such as The Trevor Project.

In January 2023, Patton was forced to cancel several scheduled appearances in Chicago after he was hospitalized in Mexico. Through his manager, he released a statement confirming that his diagnosis had progressed to AIDS and asking for assistance through a GoFundMe page.

== Filmography ==
=== Film ===
Year	Title	Role	Notes
1982	Come Back to the Five and Dime, Jimmy Dean, Jimmy Dean	Joe Qualley	Feature film
1982	Anna to the Infinite Power	Rowan Hart	TV film
1985	A Nightmare on Elm Street 2: Freddy's Revenge	Jesse Walsh	Feature film
1989	Misplaced	Roughneck	
2003	Freddy vs. Jason	Jesse Walsh	Archive footage; special thanks
2010	Never Sleep Again: The Elm Street Legacy	Himself	Documentary
2016	Family Possessions	Tyson	Feature film
2017	Amityville: Evil Never Dies	James	Feature film
2019	Scream, Queen! My Nightmare on Elm Street	Himself	Documentary
2022	Swallowed	Rich	Feature film
2022	The Once and Future Smash	Himself	Mockumentary
2022	Reunion From Hell 2	Ryan Lavery	Feature Film

=== Television ===
Year	Title	Role	Notes
1983	Kelsey's Son	Tim Kelsey	Television pilot
1986	CBS Schoolbreak Special	Chris Jenson	Episode: "Have You Tried Talking to Patty?"
1986	Hotel	Todd Radcliff	Episode: "Recriminations"
