= Freddy Krueger =

Character from A Nightmare on Elm Street

- A Nightmare on Elm Street character
- Robert Englund as Freddy Krueger
- First appearance: A Nightmare on Elm Street (1984)
- Created by: Wes Craven
- Portrayed by: Robert Englund; Michael Bailey Smith; Chase Schrimer; Tobe Sexton; Jackie Earle Haley

In-universe information
- Aliases: The Springwood Slasher; The Dream Demon
- Classification: Mass murderer
- Primary location: Springwood, Ohio
- Signature weapon: Bladed glove
- Status: Alive and dead

Freddy Krueger (/ˈkruːɡər/) is a fictional character and the antagonist of the A Nightmare on Elm Street horror film franchise. Created by Wes Craven, he made his debut in Craven's A Nightmare on Elm Street (1984) as the malevolent spirit of a child killer who had been burned to death by his victims' parents after evading prison. Krueger goes on to murder his victims in their dreams, causing their deaths in the real world as well. In the dream world, he is a powerful force and seemingly invulnerable. However, whenever Freddy is pulled back into the real world, he has normal human vulnerabilities and can be destroyed.

Freddy is commonly identified by his burned, disfigured face, dirty red-and-green-striped sweater and brown fedora, and trademark metal-clawed, brown leather, right hand glove. This glove was the product of Krueger's own imagination, having welded the blades himself before using it to murder many of his victims, both in the real and dream worlds. Over the course of the film series, Freddy has battled several reccurring survivors including Nancy Thompson and Alice Johnson. The character was consistently portrayed by Robert Englund in the original film series as well as in the television spin-off Freddy's Nightmares. In the 2010 reboot of the original film, Jackie Earle Haley plays Krueger. The reboot portrays him as an undead groundskeeper accused of molesting the students.

The character quickly became a pop culture icon going on to appear in toy lines, comic books, books, sneakers, costumes, and video games since his debut. In 2003, Krueger appeared alongside fellow horror icon Jason Voorhees in Freddy vs. Jason. Wizard magazine rated Freddy the 14th-greatest villain of all time; the British television channel Sky2 listed him 8th, and the American Film Institute ranked him 40th on its "AFI's 100 Years...100 Heroes & Villains" list. In 2010, Freddy was nominated for the award for Best Villain (formerly Most Vile Villain) at the Scream Awards.

== Appearances ==
=== Film ===
In A Nightmare on Elm Street, Freddy is introduced as a serial child killer, Fred Krueger, from the fictional town of Springwood, Ohio, who kills his victims with a bladed leather glove he crafted in a boiler room where he used to take his 20 victims. He is captured, but is set free on a technicality when it is discovered that the search warrant was not signed in the right place. He is hunted down by a mob made up of the town's vengeful parents and cornered in the boiler room, where he is burned to death. His spirit lives on within the dreams of the mob's surviving children – a group of teenagers and pre-adolescents also known as the "Elm Street children". He preys on them by entering their dreams and killing them, fueled by the town's fear of him.

Freddy as seen in A Nightmare on Elm Street 2: Freddy's Revenge (1985)

Freddy is apparently destroyed at the end of the first film by protagonist Nancy Thompson (Heather Langenkamp), but the last scene reveals that he has survived. He goes on to antagonize the teenage protagonists of the film's sequels, including Jesse Walsh (Mark Patton), Kristen Parker (Patricia Arquette), Alice Johnson (Lisa Wilcox), and Lori Campbell (Monica Keena).

In A Nightmare on Elm Street 3: Dream Warriors, more of Freddy's backstory is revealed by the mysterious nun who repeatedly appears to Dr. Neil Gordon (Craig Wasson). Freddy's mother, Amanda Krueger (Nan Martin), was a nun and a nurse at the asylum. At the time she worked there, a run-down wing of the asylum was used to lock up hundreds of the most insane criminals. When Amanda was young, she was accidentally locked in with the criminals over a holiday weekend. They managed to keep her hidden for days, raping her repeatedly. When she was finally discovered, she was barely alive and pregnant. This earned Krueger his nickname as "the bastard son of a hundred maniacs". Freddy also reveals that he gains strength from the souls of those he kills.

In Freddy's Dead: The Final Nightmare, it is revealed that Freddy was adopted by an alcoholic named Mr. Underwood (Alice Cooper), who abused Freddy throughout his childhood until finally Mr. Underwood was murdered by the teenaged Freddy (Tobe Sexton), becoming his first kill. Freddy tortured animals and engaged in self-mutilation, and became a serial killer by murdering the children of people who had bullied him when he was a child. Prior to his murder, he was married to a woman named Loretta (Lindsey Fields), whom he also murdered after she discovered his secret. He also had a daughter, Katherine/Maggie (Lisa Zane), who seeks to end her father's horrific legacy once and for all, killing him at the end of the movie.

Freddy's original murder is also shown on-screen in this film, and the reason for his continual survival explained. The mob of parents douses the building he is in with gasoline and sets it on fire by throwing Molotov cocktails, burning him alive. While his body dies, he is offered a deal to live forever within his victims' dreams by a trio of "dream demons" who wish to make him their willing instrument of evil.

After a hiatus following the release of The Final Nightmare, Krueger was brought back in Wes Craven's New Nightmare by Wes Craven, who had not worked on the film series since the third film, Dream Warriors. New Nightmare coincided with the approaching anniversary of the release of the first film, and occurs outside the continuity of the other films, being set in the "real world" of the film's cast and crew.

In the film, Robert Englund, who portrayed Krueger throughout the original film series, takes the role of a fictional version of himself. He and the main character, Heather Langenkamp (also playing a fictionalized version of herself), are stalked by an ancient demonic entity that has assumed the Freddy character and is hunting the creators of the films. Speaking to Langenkamp about his own dreams, Englund describes this embodiment of Freddy as darker and more evil than the version portrayed by him; he struggles to keep his sanity intact in the face of Krueger's torments and goes into hiding with his family.

The entity also haunts Wes Craven's dreams, to the point that he sees future events related to Krueger's actions and then writes them down as a movie script. Craven tells Langenkamp this entity has appeared in various manifestations throughout the ages, such as the old witch from Hansel and Gretel, and can be captured through storytelling. It sees Langenkamp as its primary foe because her character Nancy Thompson was the first to defeat it, making her the "gatekeeper" between the film world and the real world. In order to stop it from crossing over into the real world for good, Langenkamp must play Nancy one last time and defeat Freddy.

Krueger's attempts to cross over to reality cause a series of earthquakes throughout Los Angeles County, including the 1994 Northridge earthquake. Langenkamp, with help from her son Dylan (Miko Hughes), ultimately succeeds in defeating the entity and trapping it in the film world. The film's postmodern and metafictional genre elements are considered a precursor to Craven's 1996 film Scream.

In 2003, Freddy battled fellow horror icon Jason Voorhees (Ken Kirzinger) from the Friday the 13th film series in the theatrical release Freddy vs. Jason, a film which officially resurrected both characters from their respective deaths and subsequently sent them to Hell. As the film begins, Krueger is frustrated at his current inability to kill as knowledge of him has been hidden in Springwood, prompting him to manipulate Jason into killing in his place in the hope that the resulting fear will remind others of him so that he can resume his own murder spree.

However, Freddy's plan proves too effective when Jason starts killing people before Freddy can do it, culminating in a group of teens learning the truth and drawing Freddy and Jason to Camp Crystal Lake in the hope that they can draw Freddy into the real world so that Jason will kill him and remain "home". The ending of the film is left ambiguous as to whether or not Freddy is actually dead; despite being decapitated, when Jason emerges from the lake carrying his head he looks and winks at the audience. A sequel featuring Ash Williams (Bruce Campbell) from the Evil Dead franchise was planned, but never materialized onscreen. It was later turned into Dynamite Entertainment's comic book series Freddy vs. Jason vs. Ash.

In the 2010 remake of the original film, Freddy's backstory is that he was a groundskeeper at Springwood Badham Preschool who tortured and sexually abused the teenage protagonists of the film when they were children. When their parents found out, they trapped him in a boiler room at an industrial park and set it on fire with a Molotov cocktail made out of a gasoline canister, killing him.

As a spirit, he takes his revenge on the teenagers by haunting their dreams; he is particularly obsessed with Nancy Holbrook (Rooney Mara), who had been his "favorite" when she was a child. Krueger's power comes from his prey's memories and emotions upon remembering the abuse they suffered at his hands. His bladed glove is made out of discarded pieces of his gardening tools. Nancy destroys him at the end of the film by pulling his spirit into the physical world and cutting his throat; the final scene reveals that Freddy's spirit has survived, however.

=== Television ===
Englund continued to portray Krueger in the 1988 television anthology series, Freddy's Nightmares. The show was hosted by Freddy, who did not take direct part in most of the episodes, but he did show up occasionally to influence the plot of particular episodes. Further, a consistent theme in each episode was characters having disturbing dreams. The series ran for 44 episodes over two seasons, ending on March 12, 1990.

Although a bulk of the episodes did not feature Freddy taking a major role in the plot, the pilot episode, "No More, Mr. Nice Guy", depicts the events of his trial, and his subsequent death at the hands of the parents of Elm Street after his acquittal. In "No More, Mr. Nice Guy", though Freddy's case seems open and shut, a mistrial is declared based on the arresting officer, Lt. Tim Blocker (Ian Patrick Williams), not reading Krueger his Miranda rights, which is different from the original Nightmare, which stated he was released because someone forgot to sign the search warrant in the right place. The episode also reveals that Krueger used an ice cream van to lure children close enough so that he could kidnap and kill them. After the town's parents burn Freddy to death he returns to haunt Blocker in his dreams. Freddy gets his revenge when Blocker is put under anesthesia at the dentist's office, and Freddy shows up and kills him. The episode "Sister's Keeper" was a "sequel" to this episode, even though it was the seventh episode of the series. The episode follows Krueger as he terrorizes Blocker's identical twin daughters and frames one sister for the other's murder.

Season two's "It's My Party And You'll Die If I Want You To" featured Freddy attacking a high school prom date who stood him up 20 years earlier. He gets his revenge with his desire being fulfilled in the process.

=== Video games ===
Freddy's first video game appearance was in the 1989 Commodore 64 game A Nightmare on Elm Street, published by Monarch and developed by Westwood Associates, which was followed by the 1990 NES game A Nightmare on Elm Street, published by LJN Toys and developed by Rare.

Freddy Krueger appeared as a downloadable playable character for the 2011 game Mortal Kombat, with Robert Englund reprising his role. He has become the second non-Mortal Kombat character to appear in the game. In an interview with PlayStation.Blog, Mortal Kombat co-creator Ed Boon cited the character's violent nature and iconic status as reasoning for the inclusion in the game, "Over the years, we've certainly had a number of conversations about guest characters. At one point, we had a conversation about having a group—imagine Freddy, Jason, Michael Myers, Leatherface from The Texas Chain Saw Massacre. We never got a grip on how we would do it, whether they'd be DLC characters or what. We also wanted to introduce a character who was unexpected. This DLC thing opens the doors to realising these ideas." Krueger went on to become playable in the mobile edition of the game's sequel, Mortal Kombat X, alongside Jason from Friday the 13th.

The 2010 remake incarnation of Krueger was released as a downloadable playable character in the seventh chapter of the asymmetric survival horror game Dead by Daylight in October 2017, alongside Quentin Smith and a Springwood map.

Freddy Krueger appears as a purchasable skin in Fortnite during 2026's edition of their Fortnitemares event, with Robert Englund reprising his role. He joined the game on October 1, and became purchasable the following day.

== Creation and development ==
Wes Craven said his inspiration for the basis of Freddy Krueger's power stemmed from several stories in the Los Angeles Times about a series of mysterious deaths: All the victims had reported recurring nightmares and died in their sleep. Craven's original script explicitly characterized Freddy as a child molester, which Englund said was the "most evil, corrupt thing" he could think of. The decision was made to change him to a child murderer in order to avoid being accused of exploiting the spate of highly publicized child molestation cases in California around the time A Nightmare on Elm Street went into production.

Craven's inspirations for the character included a bully from his school during his youth, a disfigured homeless man who had frightened him when he was 12, and the 1970s pop song "Dream Weaver" by Gary Wright. In an interview, Craven said of the disfigured stranger:

When I looked down there was a man very much like Freddy walking along the sidewalk. He must have sensed that someone was looking at him and stopped and looked right into my face. He scared the living daylights out of me, so I jumped back into the shadows. I waited and waited to hear him walk away. Finally I thought he must have gone, so I stepped back to the window. The guy was not only still looking at me but he thrust his head forward as if to say, 'Yes, I'm still looking at you.' The man walked towards the apartment building's entrance. I ran through the apartment to our front door as he was walking into our building on the lower floor. I heard him starting up the stairs. My brother, who is ten years older than me, got a baseball bat and went out to the corridor but he was gone.

=== Portrayals and design ===
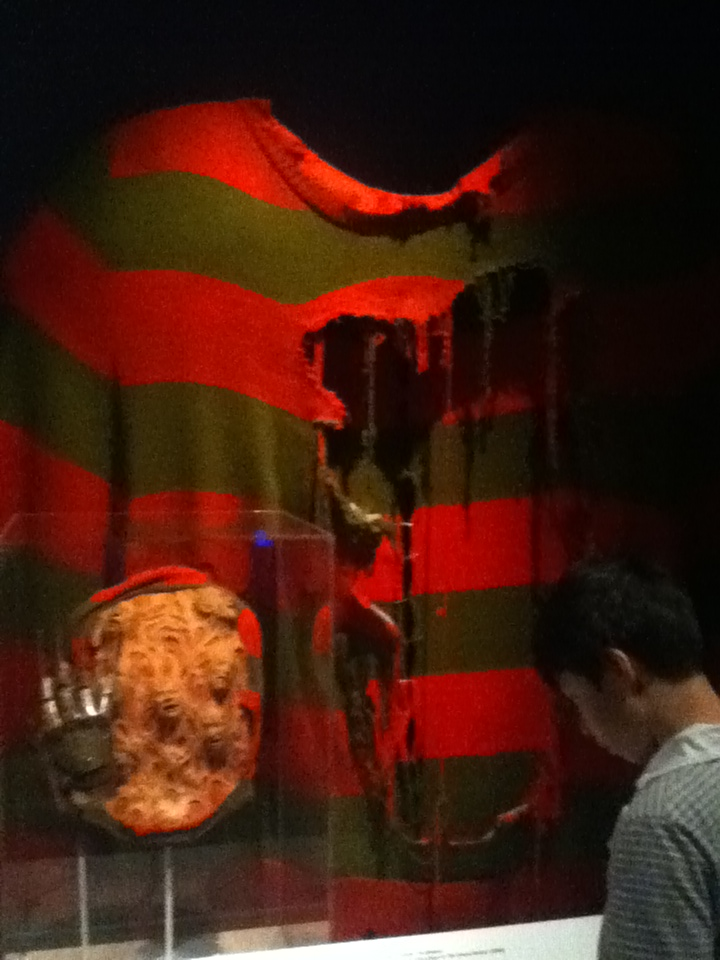
Freddy Krueger sweatshirt from A Nightmare on Elm Street 4: The Dream Master, the fourth film in the series

According to Robert Englund, Freddy's look was based on Klaus Kinski's portrayal of Count Dracula in Nosferatu the Vampyre (1979) and some of the works of Lon Chaney, while he based Freddy's poise and gait on the "Cagney stance" originated by actor James Cagney. Freddy's characteristic of keeping his gloved arm lower than the other was incidental due to the knives being heavy to wear for Englund and forcing him to carry himself as such while playing the role.

Freddy's physical appearance has stayed largely consistent throughout the film series, although small changes were made in subsequent films. He wears a striped red-and-green sweater (solid red sleeves in the original film), a dark brown fedora, his bladed glove, loose black trousers (brown in the original film), and worn work boots, in keeping with his blue collar background. The choice to have Freddy wear a fedora was reportedly Craven's idea.

In a 2018 interview, Englund stated:

The fedora was Wes's idea. But he'd been talked into maybe trying some other hats. And they had this box of hats, and we're sitting on the floor—kind of uncomfortably, both of these grown men on this futon—and [they're] telling me to put on all of these different hats. I'm sitting there in makeup going, "Guys, please, the fedora is right." And they kept putting on like, paperboy hats, and baseball hats, and God, one looked like a pimp hat. It was like, "What are you thinking, you guys?" I think I said something to Wes like, "Look, the fedora was your idea." And I stood and showed my shadow on the wall with the [fedora] hat, and how strong that silhouette was. And then I took the hat off and showed the baldness, revealing the baldness, and how he could save that for the right time in the movie. And I kind of got my way.

Freddy's skin is scarred and burned as a result of being burned alive by the parents of Springwood, and he has no hair at all on his head as it presumably all burned off. In the original film, only Freddy's face was burned, while the scars have spread to the rest of his body from the second film onwards. His blood is occasionally a dark, oily color, or greenish in hue when he is in the Dreamworld.

In the original film, Freddy remains in the shadows and under lower light much longer than he does in the later pictures. In the second film, there are some scenes where Freddy is shown without his bladed glove, and instead with the blades protruding from the tips of his fingers. As the films began to emphasize the comedic, wise-cracking aspect of the character, he began to don various costumes and take on other forms, such as a giant snake-like creature (Dream Warriors), a nurse (The Dream Master), a superhero and a chef (The Dream Child), a video game sprite (Freddy's Dead), and a hookah-smoking caterpillar (Freddy vs. Jason).

In New Nightmare, Freddy's appearance is updated considerably, giving him a green fedora that matches his sweater stripes, skin-tight leather pants, knee-high black boots, a turtleneck version of his trademark sweater, a blue-black trench coat, and a fifth claw on his glove, which also has a far more organic appearance, resembling the exposed muscle tissue of an actual hand. Freddy also has fewer burns on his face, though these are more severe, with his muscle tissue exposed in numerous places. Compared to his other incarnations, this Freddy's injuries are more like those of an actual burn victim.

For the 2010 remake, Freddy is returned to his iconic attire, but the burns on his face are intensified with further bleaching of the skin and exposed facial tissue on the left cheek, more reminiscent of actual third-degree burns than in the original series.

==== Bladed glove ====
Robert Englund as Freddy Krueger in A Nightmare on Elm Street 3: Dream Warriors (1987), wearing his bladed glove

Wes Craven stated that part of the inspiration for Freddy's infamous bladed glove was from his cat, as he watched it claw the side of his couch one night.

In an interview he said:

Part of it was an objective goal to make the character memorable, since it seems that every character that has been successful has had some kind of unique weapon, whether it be a chain saw or a machete, etc. I was also looking for a primal fear which is embedded in the subconscious of people of all cultures. One of those is the fear of teeth being broken, which I used in my first film. Another is the claw of an animal, like a saber-toothed tiger reaching with its tremendous hooks. I transposed this into a human hand. The original script had the blades being fishing knives.

When Jim Doyle, the creator of Freddy's claw, asked Craven what he wanted, Craven responded, "It's kind of like really long fingernails, I want the glove to look like something that someone could make who has the skills of a boilermaker." Doyle explained, "Then we hunted around for knives. We picked out this bizarre-looking steak knife, we thought that this looked really cool, we thought it would look even cooler if we turned it over and used it upside down. We had to remove the back edge and put another edge on it, because we were actually using the knife upside down." Later Doyle had three duplicates of the glove made, two of which were used as stunt gloves in long shots.

For New Nightmare, Lou Carlucci, the effects coordinator, remodeled Freddy's glove for a more "organic look". He says, "I did the original glove on the first Nightmare and we deliberately made that rough and primitive-looking, like something that would be constructed in somebody's home workshop. Since this is supposed to be a new look for Freddy, Craven and everybody involved decided that the glove should be different. This hand has more muscle and bone texture to it, the blades are shinier and in one case, are retractable. Everything about this glove has a much cleaner look to it, it's more a natural part of his hand than a glove." The new glove has five claws.

In the 2010 remake, the glove is redesigned as a metal gauntlet with four finger bars, but it is patterned after its original design. Owing to this iteration of the character's origin as a groundskeeper, from the outset it was a gardener's glove modified as an instrument of torture, and its blades were based on a garden fork.

Freddy's glove appeared in the 1987 horror-comedy Evil Dead II above the door on the inside of a toolshed. This was Sam Raimi's response to Wes Craven showing footage of The Evil Dead in A Nightmare on Elm Street, which was a response to Raimi putting a poster of Craven's 1977 film The Hills Have Eyes in The Evil Dead. This, in turn, was a response to a ripped-up Jaws poster in The Hills Have Eyes. The glove also appears in the 1998 horror-comedy Bride of Chucky in an evidence locker room that also contains the remains of the film's villain Chucky, the chainsaw of Leatherface from The Texas Chainsaw Massacre, and the masks of Michael Myers from Halloween and Jason Voorhees from Friday the 13th.

At the end of the film Jason Goes to Hell: The Final Friday, the mask of the title character, Jason Voorhees, played by Kane Hodder, is dragged under the earth by Freddy's gloved hand. Freddy's gloved hand, in the ending, was played by Hodder.

== In popular culture ==
At Six Flags St. Louis' Fright Fest event (then known as Fright Nights), Krueger was the main character for the event's first year in 1988. He reappeared in his own haunted house, Freddy's Nightmare: The Haunted House on Elm Street, for the following two years. Freddy Krueger appeared alongside Jason Voorhees and Leatherface as minor icons during Halloween Horror Nights 17 and again with Jason during Halloween Horror Nights 25 at Universal Orlando Resort and Universal Studios Hollywood. In 2016, Freddy Krueger returned to Halloween Horror Nights, along with Jason, in Hollywood.

Freddy Krueger made various appearances in Robot Chicken voiced by Seth Green. In the episode "That Hurts Me", Freddy appears as a housemate of "Horror Movie Big Brother", alongside other famous slasher movie killers such as Michael Myers, Jason Voorhees, Leatherface, Pinhead and Ghostface. In The Simpsons episode Treehouse of Horror VI segment "A Nightmare on Evergreen Terrace", Groundskeeper Willie played the Freddy Krueger role.

In 1992, Freddy Krueger made an unlicensed appearance in a Belarusian children's film titled "Keshka i Fredi", or "Keshka i Fredi", directed by Boris Berzner. The film focused on the Belarusian youth, Keshka, who is described as being a "...Tom Sawyer successor", and a "...a pioneer at heart...", who decides to skip out on his school's English lessons to attend a showing of A Nightmare on Elm Street 4: The Dream Master at a cultural center.

The character returned to television in an episode of The Goldbergs titled "Mister Knifey-Hands" with Englund reprising his role in a cameo. Freddy Krueger appears as an OASIS avatar in Ready Player One.

The frog species Lepidobatrachus laevis had been given multiple nicknames, one of which is the "Freddy Krueger frog" for its unwebbed front toes and aggressive nature.

In 2023, Firkantus freddykruegeri, a prehistoric ichneumonid parasitoid wasp, was named after Freddy. The name emphasizes the similar features of the insect and the fictional character—long claws and arolium.
