= Kristen Parker =

Film character from the A Nightmare on Elm Street series

- A Nightmare on Elm Street character
- Patricia Arquette (left) and Tuesday Knight (right) as Kristen Parker
- First appearance: A Nightmare on Elm Street 3: Dream Warriors
- Last appearance: A Nightmare on Elm Street 4: The Dream Master
- Created by: Wes Craven; Bruce Wagner
- Portrayed by: Patricia Arquette (Dream Warriors); Tuesday Knight (Dream Master)

In-universe information
- Occupation: High school student
- Family: Elaine Parker (mother); Kirk Parker (father)
- Origin: Springwood, Ohio
- Notable relations: Nancy Thompson (therapist; deceased); Rick Johnson (boyfriend; deceased); Alice Johnson (friend)
- Status: Deceased
- Year of birth: 1969 (Note: Per her gravestone as seen in The Dream Master.)

Kristen Parker is a character from the A Nightmare on Elm Street series. She is a co-protagonist and final girl of the third film of the series A Nightmare on Elm Street 3: Dream Warriors and the false protagonist in the following film A Nightmare on Elm Street 4: The Dream Master, and has appeared in various merchandise as well. She is played by actress Patricia Arquette in Dream Warriors and Tuesday Knight in The Dream Master. She is the central member of the titular Dream Warriors, seven teens who have to learn to fight as a group in order to survive their spectral tormentor, enigmatic murderer Freddy Krueger, and has the ability to bring others into her dreams as well as being an Olympic-level acrobat in her dreams.

== Appearances ==
=== Film ===
Kristen Parker (Patricia Arquette) first appears in Dream Warriors in its opening scene in a nightmare, where a terrible, disfigured man is relentlessly stalking and tormenting her, ultimately making her appear to slit her wrists as a suicide attempt in real life, which forces her mother Elaine to commit her to Westin Hills Psychiatric Hospital. This leads to Kristen joining up with Phillip Anderson, Joey Crusel, Roland Kincaid, Will Stanton, Jennifer Caulfield and Taryn White, who have all had the same experiences with a terrible "bogeyman" in their dreams. The conservative Dr. Elizabeth Simms refuses to acknowledge any supernatural elements in their afflictions, instead insisting that the common element of a bogeyman in their dreams is the result of mass hysteria and "the by-products of guilt". A new staff member is introduced to the teenagers – Nancy Thompson from the original Elm Street film. When her tormentor attempts to kill her in another nightmare in the form of a giant grotesque snake, a terrified Kristen desperately pulls Nancy, the only staff member she truly trusts, into the dream world, and Nancy's unexpected appearance and attack distracts the monster long enough for the two to escape. After Phil and Jennifer dies in their sleep, in what appears to be accidents or suicide, Nancy explains to the five remaining patients and Dr. Neil Gordon that the identity of the bogeyman is Freddy Krueger, a serial child killer whom their parents, including Nancy's, lynched and burned to death years ago, and his undead spirit is now after their children in their nightmares as revenge.

Nancy concludes that Kristen has the ability to draw others into her dreams and that her gifts could be used to beat Krueger. After an unauthorized group hypnosis causes Joey to be captured by Krueger and rendered comatose, Nancy and Dr. Gordon are fired, which causes Kristen to go ballistic and consequently be sedated and sent to the quiet room for her outburst. While Neil and Nancy's father Donald go on a mission to give Krueger's remains a proper burial in reality, Nancy is granted one final meeting with the teenagers, and using group hypnosis they enter the dream world just as Kristen succumbs to the sedation. Taryn and Will are both killed by Krueger, while Nancy, Kristen and Roland succeeds in rescuing Joey and later seemingly defeats Krueger, but as Kristen watches in horror, he one-ups them by appearing to and fatally stabbing Nancy in the guise of her father, whom unknown to Nancy he had killed in real life while the 'dream warriors' were busy in the dream world. Neil succeeds in sprinkling Krueger's bones with holy water and he is seemingly vanquished in the dream world before he can murder Kristen as well. In tears, Kristen promises to send the dying Nancy into a "beautiful dream", and some time after, Kristen, Neil, Roland and Joey attends Nancy's funeral.

By the time of The Dream Master, Kristen (Tuesday Knight) has returned to a seemingly normal life but experiences ominous, foreboding dreams that seem to constantly hint that Freddy Krueger is still around, although he does not directly show himself to her. In the sequel she has become a compulsive smoker in order to soothe herself. She is now romantically involved with classmate Rick Johnson and has also befriended his sister Alice, along with Sheila Kopecky and Debbie Stevens. Kristen's nocturnal anguish and paranoia causes her to repeatedly draw in fellow surviving dream warriors Roland Kincaid and Joey Crusel into her dreams on instinct whenever she feels threatened, a habit they both berate her for. However, Kristen's worst fears prove to be true as Krueger resurrects himself in Kincaid's dream and murders him during a night when Kristen keeps herself awake and thus incapable of coming to his aid; he then murders Joey as well, and the following morning Kristen talks about her fears to Alice, who recommend her to take control of her dreams and "think of someplace fun". Kristen panics when she notices that Joey and Kincaid are both missing from their seats in class and realizes what has happened – in the turmoil she is knocked unconscious and then dreams that the school nurse attending to her is Krueger, but is woken up by the real nurse before he can kill her.

Now resigned to her inevitable doom, Kristen finally tells Alice, Rick and his friend Dan Jordan about Freddy Krueger at the former Thompson/Walsh house at 1428 Elm Street, now a decaying haunted house. They are interrupted by Kristen's mother Elaine, who calls her daughter home. There they have dinner together, but Kristen realizes that her mother had put sleeping pills into her milk in a misguided attempt to help her. Kristen desperately tries to call Alice, but falls asleep. Kristen manages to dream herself into her "beautiful dream", a placid tropical beach, but Krueger interrupts and corrupts the dream into another nightmare. Relentlessly taunted by Krueger in his labyrinthine 1428/factory amalgamation, Kristen calls for Alice in panic, drawing her into Kristen's dream. Tearfully, Kristen tries to wake her up and apologizes, but as Kristen defiantly tries to shield Alice from Krueger, Alice watches in horror as he throws Kristen into his boiler, burning her alive, but before she dies, she gives her powers to Alice, though it passes through Krueger first, who then takes Kristen's soul. At the Parker's house, Alice, Rick and Elaine watches helplessly as Kristen's body roasts away, seemingly a bed-smoking accident in real life. Alice realizes afterwards that she has absorbed much of Kristen's personal traits as well, feeling an unexpected urge to smoke as Kristen did. Freddy later shows taunting visions of Kristen to Alice and Rick in their dreams, but her soul and many others are set free from Freddy's oppression by Alice when she defeats him.

=== Literature ===
Likely due to the transitional nature of Kristen's character arc in regards to Nancy and Alice, Kristen has not appeared as an active part of expanded universe storylines like those two, but was mentioned and shown in flashbacks or cameos in the Nightmares on Elm Street and the non-canonical Freddy vs. Jason vs. Ash: The Nightmare Warriors comic book miniseries, and is mentioned by Elaine in the unfinished A Nightmare on Elm Street: The Beginning miniseries. In Nightmares on Elm Street, Kristen wishing Nancy into a "beautiful dream" did send her into the good side of the dream world, independent of Freddy in his nightmare realm, which made Nancy strong enough to oppose him.

In the short story Le Morte De Freddy in the anthology book The Nightmares on Elm Street: Freddy Krueger's Seven Sweetest Dreams, Alice sent a letter to Neil Gordon after the events of The Dream Master, revealing that Freddy had murdered Kristen, Joey and Kincaid, but is convinced that she took care of Freddy. Freddy himself refers to Nancy, Alice and Kristen when accusing them of hating their parents.

The iconic scene of the Freddy-snake devouring Kristen appears in one issue of the MAD magazine; in one panel, he does swallow her whole but gets a heartburn from doing so. There is also a panel of Kristen expressing disgust over the undead pig she saw in her nightmare. A single frame depiction of the "snake scene" is also briefly shown in another issue.

=== Other appearances ===
Kristen and the rest of the "Dream Warriors" as seen in the Commodore 64/DOS game.

Kristen Parker is a playable character in the Commodore 64 and MS-DOS game A Nightmare on Elm Street, not to be confused with the unrelated NES game by the same name. Independently of each other, both games are based upon the Dream Warriors film and concept. In the C64 game, Kristen character's unique ability is the 'power kick'. Patricia Arquette as Kristen appears as the "main character" in the music video for Dokken's song "Dream Warriors" (1987), in which a haunted Kristen must summon the band in order to enlist their help in fighting Freddy Krueger. Clips of Tuesday Knight as Kristen from The Dream Master was also shown in the music video for Vinnie Vincent Invasion's "Love Kills" (1988) from All Systems Go, which is also in the soundtrack for the film.

The scene of Kristen being swallowed by the Freddy-snake in Dream Warriors was featured at the Freddy vs. Jason section at Halloween Horror Nights #25 in 2015. Kristen Parker has been featured in one action figure, in the series Cinema of Fear #1 from Mezco Toys, also depicting the aforementioned scene.

Roy H. Wagner, the cinematographer for A Nightmare on Elm Street 3: Dream Warriors, re-created scenes featuring Kristen from his film in 2019 while using only an iPhone 11 Pro for the production; in this re-creation Kristen is played by actress Taylor Kalupa. iJustine also got a shot at playing Kristen as a stand-in in her own behind-the-scenes feature of Wagner's project.

== Reception ==
Chuck Russell, director of Dream Warriors, said on Never Sleep Again: The Elm Street Legacy that "the cast member that stuck out with me was Patricia Arquette. That was her first film. There was something so interesting, so haunting about her. And I think that's always been a special gift for her in her other work as well." Producer Sara Risher claims that she was disappointed at the time that Arquette could not reprise her role, commending her as an "integral part to Nightmare 3" and as well-liked by the rest of the crew. Heather Langenkamp also praised Arquette, saying that "[Nancy's death scene is] one of my favourite scenes now out of all the scenes I've ever done, it had the most gripping reality to it with Kristen and me in that final scene. I just find it so touching and it was a very, very real scene to shoot and we were very fond of each other so it was an easy. I feel that scene really stands out", and that "it's just so rare to get somebody who has laid out their whole soul like that and they're distressed so realistically, she just did such a good job. It's just a testament to what a fine actress she is". Kristen has (for Dream Warriors) been called "one of the most beloved and well-remembered characters from the franchise" and "a role that was as important as Heather Langenkamp's Nancy Thompson".

Though Ken Sagoes has mentioned on Never Sleep Again that he did not think his and Rodney Eastman's chemistry was as good with Tuesday Knight as it was with Patricia Arquette, he has also spoken highly of Knight in other interviews:

"I don't think Tuesday Knight was given enough credit for what she had to do. I think that out of all of us, she had one of the difficult roles to play, because she had to embody a role that Patricia (Arquette) had beautifully played. But Tuesday, did not skip a beat, she stepped in and made Kristen her's with the highest respect."

According to Tuesday Knight, Wes Craven had, when calling her about a cameo in New Nightmare, expressed that he was a big fan of Knight's portrayal of Kristen and had expressed criticism of the writing for the Kristen of the theatrical Dream Warriors, explaining that he had written her to be more of a fighter but the changes done by the other scriptwriters and director reduced her to too much of a victim, while Knight's take on Kristen was more in line with how Craven had originally envisioned the character. In another interview, Knight talks about the subject of Kristen as a victim:

"Kristen encapsulates so much of what women should be today—not a victim, but someone who spoke up for what was right even when people thought she was crazy and, although she got it in the end, went down fighting. I see no victimization in that."

Jake Dee of JoBlo.com admires the sheer boldness of killing Kristen off midway into The Dream Master, arguing that her death happened in spite of Tuesday Knight providing the theme song and doubles its impact by ending the life of a protagonist and handing over the lead role to a new lead.

Kristen was at 18 on Buzzfeed's top 25 list of final girls and on the top 10 final girls in the digital SCREAM magazine (in no particular order), which states that "Patricia Arquette's depiction of the role injects an impressive amount of gumption into the part; as she brings with her a new twist to the tale- the power to pull other people into her dreams".

== Development ==
=== Conception ===
While the changes between drafts concerning Kristen in Dream Warriors are not quite as extensive as those for Nancy's character, some changes do occur. In the original script, Kristen's mother is named Alice and not Elaine, and she is still married to her husband and Kristen's father, Kirk Parker. Though ultimately omitted from the theatrical script and film, where Elaine is definitely single and apparently attempting to date various men, Kirk Parker would later appear in a flashback in the comic book A Nightmare on Elm Street: The Beginning, the script of which refers to the couple as "rich snobs" and Elaine as "Kristen's bitchy mother".

In the original script, in addition to the ability of bringing others into her dreams, Kristen is shown to be capable of daydreaming that she tears up the clothing of Sally, a classmate who made fun of her, and this happens in real life without Kristen having been near her in reality. Kristen mentions having, or having had, a brother in the script and Freddy ends up killing her mother in a scene reminiscent of the pool party scene in Freddy's Revenge. Furthermore, Kristen would be the last surviving patient and Elm Street child, as both Joey and Kincaid would have perished by the end of the story, and the model of the 1428 Elm Street house that Kristen made in the film's opening would have been made by Joey instead, with the same outcome in regards to the end scene of the film. Both the original draft and the script for the theatrical film had an omitted end scene where Kristen and Dr. Neil Gordon talks about Nancy, implying that she now visits and protects them in their dreams, opposite of what Freddy had done and thus hinting that she is now undead in the dream world like him. This "beautiful dream" concept would later be revisited in the Nightmares on Elm Street comics.

As with Alice, Kristen's portrayal in The Dream Master differed little between the later drafts and what eventually made it into the film, with the exception of one omitted scene where Kristen faces Freddy in a dream the same night he killed Kincaid and Joey, taunting her for now being "Elm Street's last brat", while in the film she only encounters Freddy after Elaine drugs her. Steven Fierberg, cinematographer of The Dream Master, claims that there was a scene where Kristen would walk out of her own house only to find it having turned into the nightmare 1428 house and consequently encounters Freddy in a tunnel. He called it the "best sequence in the movie" and a "terrifying, great sequence", but explains that it was cut out in the last minute because "people were feeling it takes too long to get rid of Tuesday Knight and then establish Lisa Wilcox as the new heroine". This scene does exist as described in the screenplay, and a snippet from this, of Kristen saying "I knew you'd be back" can be seen in one of the trailers that was released for The Dream Master. According to Tuesday Knight, the boiler room scene where Kristen desperately summons Alice and is killed by Freddy was longer than the theatrical version, but New Line Cinema ordered director Renny Harlin to kill Kristen off within a certain time frame to make way for Alice as the new protagonist. The screenplay also has a desperate Kristen making a gymnastic attack on Freddy in vain as he stalks her further throughout the 1428 Elm Street/factory labyrinth he tends to use as a setting in nightmares:

She realizes she's standing on a catwalk high above the room. She looks around and sees that Freddy is standing in front of a furnace, watching her with a grin on his face. With a defiant cry, Kristen runs at Freddy. She does a series of cartwheels and throws herself at her tormentor, crashing into him. Caught off guard, Freddy stumbles backwards and falls onto the grating.

Another deleted scene was of Freddy tormenting Kristen with severe sunburns as she sinks through the quicksand:

Kristen is sunken halfway into the sand, preventing escape. Freddy raises his claw as if to attack Kristen and the shadow of the claw BURNS BLISTERS onto her otherwise pale skin. Freddy saunters over, unaffected by the quicksand. He watches the girl struggle and laughs when her screaming mouth fills with sand as she SINKS BELOW THE SURFACE.

Adding gravity to the suggestions of Fierberg, Harlin and Knight that New Line Cinema wanted Alice established as the new protagonist as quickly as possible, the official press kits from New Line Cinema for both The Dream Master and The Dream Child mysteriously references a plot element, of Kristen drawing Alice into a dream to face Freddy before the dream in which Kristen dies, resulting in Alice consequently helping Kristen to enlist the help of the others, that was entirely absent not only in the theatrical picture, but even from the two screenplay drafts available on the Internet:

"When Joey and Kincaid are found dead, Kristen intimates to newcomer Alice that her friends were murdered by Freddy Krueger -- in their nightmares. Alice is convinced of Freddy's lethal power after Kristen draws her into a nightmare to experience the very real terror. Together they decide to do battle with the deathly Elm Street menace, Freddy Krueger. They share their fears with friends Sheila, a scholastic genius, Alice's brother Rick, a martial arts experts who is also Kristen's boyfriend, Debbie, an attractive bodybuilder, and Dan, the handsome object of Alice's schoolgirl crush. No one will believe them."

"Kristen must persuade her friend Alice to help her. After drawing her into a dream, they attempt to rally the support of their friends, who are clearly not convinced of Freddy's existence. Undaunted, Alice tells Kristen of her "Dream Master" theory, whereby it is possibly to control nightmares by visualizing positive scenarios."

=== Casting ===
"They asked me to come back for 4 but at that time I was starting to break into kind of meatier roles. I had just done a movie of the week about teen pregnancy called Daddy and I was really liking getting deeper with my work. I love the horror genre and the Freddy franchise but I was chomping at the bit to try other things as an actor."

— Patricia Arquette (2017)

The role of Kristen Parker in Dream Warriors was the debut role for Patricia Arquette. Arquette was reportedly close to being recast early into the filming of Dream Warriors, though director Chuck Russell recognized her qualities and vouched for her to the other producers, resulting in her staying. Arquette was replaced by actress Tuesday Knight for the sequel, The Dream Master. Neither Robert Shaye, Renny Harlin nor Robert Englund has expressed any definite reason for why Arquette did not come back, though Harlin and Rodney Eastman theorized that her agent might have asked for too much in salary.

Though others speculates that the reason was Arquette's real life pregnancy with her son Enzo Rossi (January 3, 1989), the book Assault of the Killer B's: Interviews with 20 Cult Film Actresses states that "Patricia Arquette reportedly fought the [horror genre] label, turning down a hefty offer to reprise her heroine role, instead favoring more dramatic roles and becoming a respected thespian in the Hollywood community". Arquette confirmed herself in 2017 that this was in fact the case, and has also stated that director Chuck Russell had been very controlling of his actors but had apologized afterwards, while also mentioning the DP (director of photography) as having been "really horribly mean". (Note: In extended interviews on Never Sleep Again: The Elm Street Legacy, line producer Rachel Talalay reveals that Dream Warriors originally had another, foreign cinematographer who was fired by her due to being rude and abusive towards Penelope Sudrow and others, meaning that Patricia Arquette may not be referring to his replacement Roy H. Wagner.) Returning actors Eastman and Ken Sagoes expressed disappointment that the character of Kristen had to be recast and of the defaulted reunion with former co-star Arquette, while Tuesday Knight on her part has admitted to having felt out of place due to the recasting.

Tuesday Knight was told by the producers to rewatch Dream Warriors to emulate its Kristen as much as possible, but Knight thought that Arquette's Kristen had been written and portrayed as too much of a "screamer" and victim and hoped to bring a little more strength of will to the character than the previous version. Thus, she decided to try to make the role her own instead of strictly emulating Arquette. Lezlie Deane was among other actresses who auditioned for the role of Kristen in The Dream Master, but ultimately Tuesday Knight auditioned before Renny Harlin, Bob Shaye and Rachel Talalay and was "hired on the spot". She would end up contributing the song Nightmare to the film's soundtrack but did not know until she watched The Dream Master in the theater that it been chosen to be the actual title/intro song. The master record of this song, previously thought for many years to have been lost or destroyed, has since been "uncovered in a box deep within the bowels of Warner Brothers" according to Knight. Knight would also have a cameo in Wes Craven's New Nightmare (1994). According to Knight, Wes Craven had been nervous about calling Johnny Depp due to how his career had exploded since his role in A Nightmare on Elm Street in 1984, fearing that Depp would consider his new film and a mere cameo to be beneath him. Instead, he called Knight and offered her a cameo, explaining that he was a fan of how she portrayed Kristen in The Dream Master.

=== Characterization ===
In Wes Craven's and Bruce Wagner's original script from Dream Warriors, Kristen is named Kirsten and is described as "young - no more than 16 - and is stunningly beautiful", while the script for The Dream Master describes her as a "beautiful, but pensive-looking blonde teenager". In the book Hearths of Darkness: The Family In the American Horror Film, Tony Williams argues that "Kristen's death results from Elaine's complicity", and that Kristen thus "becomes a sacrificial offering in a satanic eucharist unconsciously initiated by the parental world". He argues that Kristen's dream of Freddy killing her mother expresses Elaine's real feelings toward her daughter, where her severed head taunts her that Kristen spoils it when she brings a man home for dating and that she's just using her botched "suicide attempt" and apparent sleep disorder as a mean of drawing some attention from her mother. John Kenneth Muir describes Elaine as "a horrible woman who makes no attempt to understand her suffering child", and (on accusing Kristen of "just trying to get attention") that if "[Elaine] would give her any attention [after her suicide attempt], there would be no need for Kristen to do such things". The false protagonist plot device of starting The Dream Master from Kristen's point of view and later reveal Alice as the true protagonist narratively mirrors to some degree the events of the first film, where it quickly becomes evident that the heroine of the film is Nancy and not Tina Gray. Nat Brehmer on That's Not Current elaborates on the false protagonist dimension of Kristen in The Dream Master, arguing that

"In the beginning, [Alice Johnson] plays almost second fiddle to Kristen. Even though she's played by a different actress, we're naturally expecting Kristen to be the heroine all over again, not just because she survived the last one but because she spends the first half hour of Dream Master really driving the plot. It's an incredibly similar dynamic, on some levels, to the one shared between Tina and Nancy in the original Nightmare."

Kristen's fate has also been compared to the plot twist of Janet Leigh's character Marion Crane in the Hitchcock film Psycho (1960), the apparent protagonist of the film, being killed off unexpectedly.
