= Freddy Krueger's A Nightmare on Elm Street =

1989 comic book

- Issue #1, variant cover art by Joe Jusko

Publication information
- Publisher: Marvel Comics
- Schedule: Monthly
- Format: Ongoing
- Genre: Dark fantasy, horror
- Publication date: October – November 1989
- No. of issues: 2
- Main character(s): Freddy Krueger; Allison Hayes; Dr. Juliann Quinn

Creative team
- Written by: Steve Gerber
- Pencillers: Rich Buckler (1); Tony DeZuniga (1-2)
- Inker: Alfredo Alcala
- Letterer: Janice Chiang
- Colorist: N/A
- Editor: Bob Budiansky

Freddy Krueger's A Nightmare on Elm Street was a short lived black-and-white comic book set in the A Nightmare on Elm Street universe and published by Marvel Comics in late 1989. Chronologically, its events takes place about three years after the events of A Nightmare on Elm Street 3: Dream Warriors (1987). It was cancelled after only its second issue for unclear reasons. The remaining storyline is named Dreamstalkers (part 1 & 2) and was left unresolved with a cliffhanger ending.

== Plot ==
An ambulance arrives at the home of Roger and Patti Hayes, who had found their daughter Allison near death in her bed, slashed and bruised with no hints of who attacked her. Dr. Juliann Quinn is preparing to leave New York City and her boyfriend Doug behind for her hometown of Springwood in Ohio, where she has a job offer at the Westin Hills Psychiatric Hospital waiting for her. Falling asleep, she has a nightmare about Freddy Krueger, but wakes up due to her cigarette lighting her bed up and forcing her to quench the flame quickly. In the Springwood Medical Center, Freddy attacks Allison once again while she's in surgery, but she starts to fight back on her nemesis, leading the doctors to conclude that her body tried to die, but her mind would not allow it. Juliann travels to Springwood by plane, studying Freddy's dossier, reading about Amanda Krueger and her horrific rape at the Our Lady of Sorrows' Institution For the Mentally Ill (the precursor of Westin Hills), and even starts to have nightmares about Freddy on the plane while dozing off. Once arrived, she continues to have the nightmares, but has learned mental techniques to keep Freddy from killing her for the time. Juliann is assigned to be Allison's doctor, and to Allison's relief, proves to be the only one capable of understanding what she is going through. Juliann and Allison enters the dream world together, where they encounter Freddy.

Freddy comes close to killing Juliann, but Allison turns herself into a living ball of flame and wards him off long enough for the two heroines to awake themselves. After this, Juliann has Allison put on Hypnocil while staying at the Springwood hospital. After meeting with Dr. Marlin, he makes it clear to Juliann that Allison will not be allowed to take Hypnocil once she's transferred to the Westin Hills Psychiatric Hospital, due to the scandal that happened there three years ago. At home, Juliann goes to take a shower before sleep, but she had in fact already fallen asleep and is surprised to find herself in the Oval Office, where Freddy is sitting in the president's chair. She tries to run away, but finds herself too exhausted. Freddy reappears and stabs her in the stomach while pointing out her fatal mistake: she had cared so much for Allison's safety that she had dropped the guard on her own. Allison is devastated to hear of her death and swears revenge on Freddy. Dr. Watley is reassigned to be her new doctor, but Allison refuses to explain her afflictions to him, saying it wouldn't make any difference if she did. She prepares mentally, thinking up clothing and a glove akin to Freddy's and fights him, but he ultimately tricks her, causing her to attack Watley while sleepwalking in reality, thinking that she's attacking Freddy; Watley orders for her to be sedated and sent to the secure ward.

== Development ==
=== Conception and unrealized plans ===
"I'll be doing three of the first six issues: #1, 2, and 5. Issues #3 and 4 are being written by Buzz Dixon and issue #6 will be done by Peter David. I don't know who the artist is going to be on Buzz's stories yet; Sam Kieth is doing the Peter David story."
— Steve Gerber on the unrealized plans for future issues

Joe Jusko's finished cover art for the unreleased third issue.

It was reported in Amazing Heroes #160 (March 1, 1989) that both Marvel Comics and Blackthorne Publishing had secured rights to produce comics in the A Nightmare on Elm Street universe; Blackthorne's would be eight issues of 3D adaptions of the films and Freddy's Nightmares, while Marvel Comics' would be magazine-sized, black-and-white, and was never specified to have a finite number of issues. Steve Gerber said that several writers were contacted by Marvel, and he had submitted a 3-4 pages treatment that they approved of. Rich Buckler illustrated the first 23 pages of the first issue but left due to - as Gerber speculated - "editorial conflict or financial problems", and was replaced by Tony DeZuniga for the remainder of Dreamstalkers. Gerber explained that he intended for the Dreamstalkers storyline to return with issue 5.

According to Gerber, he had created an antagonist to Freddy who would return as a recurring character; since Dr. Juliann Quinn was killed off, this would mean Allison Hayes, who was left at a cliffhanger ending. He also implied that there would have been further appearances of Allison past the fifth issue, saying "we'll pick up her story in #5 and probably after that again for a little while". Gerber reasoned that when it's (what was supposed to be) a regular monthly comic book series as opposed to films released at longer intervals, the series cannot only have its antagonist being a recurring character, but needs a recurring protagonist as well. According to Marvel Comics, the plans for the series prior to cancellation was that

"The comics series will begin with one long ELM STREET story spread over the first two issues, with forty-four page installments in each. After that, each issue will contain a NIGHTMARE ON ELM STREET story of about thirty pages in length, and there will be back-up stories by other creative teams."

Gerber stated that issue three and four would be written by Buzz Dixon and the sixth issue would be written by Peter David and illustrated by Sam Kieth. The Dixon issues were to be pencilled by Bob Hall and inked by Alfredo Alcala, while Joe Jusko, the artist behind the cover art of the two released issues, had also finished his cover for the third issue, and later posted it on the Internet. Hall and Kieth were already involved in the art for the second issue, as Hall provided two and Kieth one illustration of Freddy for it. The second issue came with an ad for the following issue in which Freddy sits in the teacher's chair in a classroom where the text "Back to School Issue" is written on the whiteboard and the disclaimer is "Freddy teaches you a lesson you'll never forget!". The plot for the third issue, called Freddy's Girl, was specified by Marvel Comics to be

"Has Freddy become a good guy? That's what it looks like! He's befriended a depressed, lonely teen-ager and is showing her why her life is worth living! But why does he really want her to live?"

Marvel Comics apparently planned for there to be a "pen pal" section in future issues for fan mail, with one of the illustrations by Bob Hall being used as art for the invitation. Buzz Dixon had also suggested a "Freddy Request Page" where the readers would be able to post requests on who they would like to see Freddy kill next, inspired by DC Comics leaving it to fan input to decide whether Jason Todd should survive the Batman: A Death in the Family storyline or not.

The fourth issue was going to contain two separate stories, one by Dixon, Hall and Alcala and the other by Peter David and Bret Blevins. Peter David claims he wrote all of issue 5, with art by Dan Lawliss and Alfredo Alcala. David also wrote a shorter 6-page story in the previous issue as a companion to Dixon's story.

Andy Mangels has stated that he had sold a plot to Marvel Comics for the fifth issue, and was going to do some work on the later issues.

=== Cancellation ===
In October 1989, it was reported that the comics had been cancelled, after an article in Comics Buyer's Guide where Marvel Comics spokesman Steve Saffel elaborated that

"For a number of reasons, we decided to cancel A Nightmare on Elm Street. It's not the first title we've canceled and it won't be the last. The direct market reacted fairly well to the book - for a black-and-white, that is - but we never saw that as the book's real market, which (like all the black-and-whites) is unquestionably the newsstand."

The Dixon and David issues had already been finished and submitted to Marvel by the time of the cancellation; according to David, "The cancellation order took a lot of people by surprise". Steve Gerber later wrote to the bulletin board-based magazine Reading for Pleasure and explained that Marvel Comics had cancelled the comics not because they had been criticized for it, but because they might eventually be criticized for it, saying

"According to my best information, Marvel cancelled the book in anticipation of pressure from the various anti-violence advocate groups. A few weeks prior to the release of the first NIGHTMARE, there had been an article published in the New York Times decrying the level of violence in comic books. Apparently, that article -- along with the picketing that took place outside theatres showing NIGHTMARE 5 in Los Angeles and elsewhere -- was enough to make Marvel turn tail and run for cover."

Gerber had also noticed that the comics already came with a "suggested for mature readers" disclaimer, and no direct pressure had yet been made on Marvel Comics about the series at the time.

Tim Webber on Comic Book Resources mentions a New York Times article from April 30, 1989 as a possible catalysis for the cancellation, in which Joe Queenan wrote about the increasingly violent content of primarily Marvel and DC Comics, such as the Joker of DC Comics brutally murdering Jason Todd in a Batman: A Death in the Family in late 1988. A Nightmare on Elm Street is mentioned indirectly through an offhand remark by George Pérez. Webber also mentions a September 1989 call for boycott by the American Family Association, condemning a Freddy merchandise doll as a "product of a sick mind", as another possible reason.

According to Buzz Dixon, Martin Goodman, founder of Marvel Comics, had told him bluntly that "I don't care if we paid for it -- we're not publishing it!" about his unpublished issues. In an online post, Peter David claimed that while the story he wrote was unlike any other he had written, he was in retrospective unsatisfied with it and slightly relieved that it never came to be published.

Tom DeFalco, former Marvel Comics editor-in-chief, explains that Jim Galton, who was president of the company at the time, was the one who cancelled the title. According to DeFalco, Galton was "a man of conscience and principal and didn't think Marvel should publish material like Nightmare", and he valued his morals higher than profit and cancelled it in spite of it being profitable and having received no complaints yet.

== Characters ==
- Freddy Krueger - In the Dreamstalkers story, Freddy is given a slightly different backstory than what was later shown in Freddy's Dead: The Final Nightmare. He was given up for adoption in November 1947 to a real estate agent named Paul Struck and his wife, but they soon caught burglars in the act in their house and were murdered, upon which the burglars added the baby to their lot and later sold him to far less cultivated foster parents, the abusive small-time procurer Walter 'Stork' Fingle and the prostitute Isabel Tront. The couple later used the boy to set men up with Isabel, while Fingle kept abusing him, slashing him with a knife, if he did not meet their expectations. One day Frederick murdered his foster parents, carved the words "Rot in Hell" on Fingle's chest with his own knife and left to become a drifter, living of mugging and petty crime and sleeping outdoors. He came to use his dreams as his only escapism from his bleak reality and later became a child killer who would abduct his victims to the abandoned power plant in Springwood, murder them and dispose of their bodies in its boiler room in the basement. He was eventually caught, released on a legal technicality and then lynched by furious parents. After this he came back as - in the words of Juliann - "a demon of the dream world - evil in its most rarefied state". Freddy's origin story in Dreamstalker is loosely based on The Life and Death of Freddy Krueger, a non-canonical account predating the Dream Warriors film.
- Allison Hayes - Allison is described by Gerber as being 15 years old and "is an inadvertent dream stalker, someone who can hunt through dreams in very much the same way that Freddy can, but who isn't dead" and that she "discovered this ability without knowing what it was a first." Allison explains to Juliann that she first encountered Freddy when she saw a new sign saying "Grossness" at a crossroad in her dreamscape. She followed the road ahead until she arrived at a strange bar, "Hideosity Bar & Grill", whose plentiful strange visitors she called a "total geekshow". Freddy was one of them, and he noticed her arrive even though she quickly tried to leave. He tried to kill her, but his glove just phased right through her dreamself. Then she left and headed back to the crossroads, where the "Grossness" sign had vanished. She did not find the bar again, but Freddy found her again some months later and continued trying to kill her.
- Dr. Juliann Quinn - Called "Jools" by Freddy, Juliann is described by Gerber as being in her early twenties and is the last of the Elm Street children, the difference between her and the ones from Dream Warriors being that her parents moved away from Springwood while she was a child, after taking part in the lynching of Freddy, and he was thus unable to get to her until she moved back to her childhood home town again. She nonetheless started to have nightmares about Freddy eventually, after having been unaware of his existence and of his systematic slaughter of all the other "Elm Street children" before her. Juliann was taught the skill of "dreamstalking" by her mentor, a Mexican lady named Doña Valencia Silva.
- Dr. Marlin - The head psychiatrist of Westin Hills Psychiatric Hospital. He got his job after the events of Dream Warriors and the deaths of four of the seven patients and a graduate student at the institution, after which his predecessor was forced to resign because of the resulting scandal. Because it was Hypnocil that was believed to be the ultimate cause of the deaths, he is unwilling to allow Juliann to keep Allison on the drug.
- Dr. Watley - An arrogant psychiatrist who keeps referring to Juliann as a "witch doctor" and has major professional difficulties with her.

== Reception ==
Both issues became the top-ranked black-and-white title on Marvel Comics, selling at #90 and #109 respectively on Capital City's associated shops.

Drew Bartorillo reviewed the comics in Reading for Pleasure #6, writing that "For those who enjoyed any of the Nightmare On Elm Street movies or the TV show, or anyone else for that matter, this magazine-size comic is a must. The black and white art is superb and you'll recognize the characters and dialog immediately", giving the Dreamstalkers story a 9 out of 10.

Protoclown on i-Mockery writes that it's a disappointment that the comics is in black and white, owing to the "anything can happen" potential of the franchise and its dream scenery, but adds that coloring it might have been underwhelming anyway given the comic book coloring available in the 80's. He also calls Juliann Quill's death underwhelming, given how important she had been to the story up until then, speculating that it might have been a change of plans due to the artists finding out they were getting cancelled, but otherwise feels that the cliffhanger ending was as good as it could have given the circumstances.

The review on Nightmare on Elm Street Companion is very positive about the comics, calling it "a wonderful homage" to the Tales from the Crypt comics, and writing that the characters are very well written. The reviewer considers the second issue to be slightly weaker, but calling the artwork still very solid and the story making the reader feel for Allison's fate in the cliffhanger ending.

Gavin Jasper on Den of Geek call Freddy's origin in the comics better written than the later one in Freddy's Dead: The Final Nightmare, and writing that while Freddy's supernatural abilities aren't quite explained, but there is still enough for the reader to understand without ruining the mystique. He also compares Freddy's origin story to Rorschach of DC Comics' Watchmen (1986–87), writing that "it's easy to see similarity between Freddy's upbringing and Rorschach's. It almost spells it out that Freddy is what would've happened if Rorschach's experiences led to him becoming the dog-owning child-killer that drove him off the deep end instead of a crazed vigilante".

Cecil & Fuego of The Horror Show on YouTube are extremely positive about the comics' artwork, also pointing out the reminiscence of its artistic style to the Tales from the Crypt comics, and highlights the comics' use of shadows as a particularly strong element of the art. The duo expresses that the black-and-white gives the comic a very classic feeling and is incredibly detailed at many parts. They state that the backstory on Amanda Krueger is more detailed than anywhere else in the franchise, such as A Nightmare on Elm Street 5: The Dream Child (1989), and is portrayed in a much more disturbing fashion, arguing that her compassion becomes her undoing.
