= A Nightmare on Elm Street 3: Dream Warriors =

1987 film by Chuck Russell

- Theatrical release poster by Matthew Peak
- Directed by: Chuck Russell
- Screenplay by: Wes Craven; Bruce Wagner; Frank Darabont; Chuck Russell
- Story by: Wes Craven; Bruce Wagner
- Based on: Characters by Wes Craven
- Produced by: Robert Shaye; Wes Craven
- Starring: Heather Langenkamp; Patricia Arquette; Laurence Fishburne; Priscilla Pointer; Craig Wasson; John Saxon; Dick Cavett; Zsa Zsa Gabor; Robert Englund
- Cinematography: Roy H. Wagner
- Edited by: Terry Stokes; Chuck Weiss
- Music by: Angelo Badalamenti
- Production companies: New Line Cinema; Heron Communications; Smart Egg Pictures
- Distributed by: New Line Cinema
- Release date: February 27, 1987 (United States)
- Running time: 96 minutes
- Country: United States
- Language: English
- Budget: $4.3–4.6 million
- Box office: $44.8 million (US)

A Nightmare on Elm Street 3: Dream Warriors is a 1987 American fantasy slasher film directed by Chuck Russell in his feature directorial debut and written by Russell along with Wes Craven, Bruce Wagner, and Frank Darabont. It is the third installment in the Nightmare on Elm Street franchise and serves as a direct sequel to A Nightmare on Elm Street (1984).

The film stars Heather Langenkamp, Patricia Arquette, Laurence Fishburne, Priscilla Pointer, Craig Wasson, and Robert Englund as Freddy Krueger. Nancy Thompson (Langenkamp), now a psychologist, and Kristen Parker (Arquette), a patient who can bring others into her own dreams, team up with other teenagers to launch a daring rescue into the dreamland and save one of them from Freddy Krueger.

After the mixed response to A Nightmare on Elm Street 2: Freddy's Revenge (1985), New Line Cinema sought out franchise creator Wes Craven to return to write the script for the third film, which he agreed to despite having a different idea for another Elm Street film.

A Nightmare on Elm Street 3: Dream Warriors was theatrically released on February 27, 1987. The film grossed $44.8 million domestically on a budget of over $4 million and received positive reviews from critics, who considered it to be one of the best films in the A Nightmare on Elm Street series. It was followed by A Nightmare on Elm Street 4: The Dream Master, released in 1988.

== Plot ==
Kristen Parker dreams of Freddy Krueger, who attacks her and makes it look like she has slit her wrist in the real world. Believing Kristen to be suicidal, her mother Elaine admits her to Westin Hills Psychiatric Hospital, where she is placed under the care of Dr. Neil Gordon.

At the hospital, Kristen fights the orderlies who try to sedate her because she fears falling asleep. Nancy Thompson, the new intern therapist who survived Freddy's killing spree six years prior, (Note: As depicted in A Nightmare on Elm Street (1984)) calms her down by reciting Freddy's nursery rhyme, helping her realize she is not alone. Nancy meets the rest of Dr. Gordon's patients: Phillip Anderson, a sleepwalker; Roland Kincaid, a tough kid from the streets; Jennifer Caulfield, a hopeful television actress; Will Stanton, who uses a wheelchair due to a prior suicide attempt; Taryn White, a recovering drug addict; and Joey Crusel, who is the youngest and too traumatized to speak. One night, Freddy attacks Kristen in her dreams; she unwittingly pulls Nancy into her dream, allowing them to escape.

Kristen reveals that she has been able to pull people into her dreams since she was young. Over the next two nights, Freddy kills Phillip and Jennifer. Nancy reveals to the remaining patients that they are "the last of the Elm Street kids," the surviving children of those who burned Krueger to death years ago. They try group hypnosis so that they can experience a shared dream and discover their dream powers. In the dream, Freddy captures Joey, leaving him comatose in the real world. The dean is furious, and Nancy and Neil are relieved of their duties. A nun named Sister Mary Helena tells Neil that Freddy was the son of Amanda Krueger, a young woman on the Westin Hills hospital staff who was accidentally locked inside with hundreds of mental patients over the holidays. They raped her continually, causing Freddy to be born. The only way to stop him is to lay his bones to rest.

Neil and Nancy ask her father, Officer Don Thompson, where the bones are hidden. Nancy rushes back to the hospital when she learns that Kristen has been sedated. Neil takes Don to help them find the bones. Nancy and the others again engage in group hypnosis to reunite with Kristen. Taryn and Will are killed by Freddy, while Kristen, Nancy, and Kincaid rescue Joey. Sensing that his remains have been found by Don and Neil, Freddy kills Don and incapacitates Neil. Don's ghost appears to Nancy, but he is revealed to be Freddy, who stabs Nancy. Freddy comes upon Kristen, but Nancy stabs him with his own glove. Neil purifies Freddy's bones, killing him, as Nancy dies in Kristen's arms.

Neil, Kristen, Kincaid, and Joey attend Nancy and Don's funeral days later. During the funeral, Neil finds Amanda Krueger's tombstone and discovers that she is Sister Mary Helena. That evening, he goes to sleep with the Malaysian doll Nancy gave him and Kristen's papier-mâché model of 1428 Elm Street nearby. Suddenly, Kristen's house lights up from the inside, suggesting that Freddy is not defeated.

== Cast ==
- Heather Langenkamp as Nancy Thompson
- Craig Wasson as Dr. Neil Gordon
- Patricia Arquette as Kristen Parker
- Robert Englund as Freddy Krueger
- Ken Sagoes as Roland Kincaid
- Rodney Eastman as Joey Crusel
- Jennifer Rubin as Taryn White
- Bradley Gregg as Phillip "The Walker" Anderson
- Ira Heiden as Will Stanton
- Laurence Fishburne as Max Daniels
- Penelope Sudrow as Jennifer Caulfield
- John Saxon as Donald Thompson
- Priscilla Pointer as Dr. Elizabeth Simms
- Clayton Landey as Lorenzo
- Brooke Bundy as Elaine Parker
- Nan Martin as Sister Mary Helena/Amanda Krueger
- Stacey Alden as Nurse Marcie
- Dick Cavett as Himself
- Zsa Zsa Gabor as Herself
- Paul Kent as Dr. Carver

== Production ==
=== Development ===
Following the critical failure of A Nightmare on Elm Street 2: Freddy's Revenge, New Line Cinema was unsure if it would continue with the series. Wes Craven, who wrote and directed the original A Nightmare on Elm Street, did not participate in the second film. He had not wanted the original to evolve into a franchise, but due to immense dissatisfaction with Freddy's Revenge, signed on to co‑write the screenplay for the third installment with the intention that it would end the series. However, the success of A Nightmare on Elm Street 3: Dream Warriors prompted a continuation of the series. Though he was offered the chance to direct, Craven himself would be unavailable for directing, as he was tied up with filming Deadly Friend and doing reshoots of The Serpent and the Rainbow around the same time.

Craven's first concept for the film was to have Freddy Krueger (Robert Englund) invade the real world: Krueger would haunt the actors filming a new Nightmare on Elm Street sequel. New Line Cinema rejected the metacinematic idea, but years later, Craven's concept was brought to the screen in Wes Craven's New Nightmare.

Before the script was finalized, in 1986 John Saxon and Robert Englund wrote their own scripts for a third Nightmare film. In Saxon's script—a prequel story called How the Nightmare on Elm Street All Began—Freddy is ultimately innocent, or at least set up for the murders by the main culprits Charles Manson and the Manson Family. Freddy is forced by a mob of angry parents to confess to the crimes, which enrages them further. After lynching Freddy, he comes back to avenge his wrongful death by targeting the mob's children. In Englund's treatment, Freddy's Funhouse, the protagonist is the older sister of Tina Gray (Amanda Wyss), who was away at college when Tina was murdered and returns to Springwood to investigate how she died. Freddy had claimed the 1428 Elm Street house for his own in the dreamworld, setting up booby traps like Nancy Thompson (Heather Langenkamp) had done against him. According to Englund, after the script had been unused for years, part of it was used in "No More Mr. Nice Guy", the pilot episode of Freddy's Nightmares.

=== Writing ===
Wes Craven has said, about the franchise's guidance by he and Bruce Wagner, that "we decided that it could no longer be one person fighting Freddy. It had to be a group, because the souls of Freddy's victims have made Freddy stronger". He also called Heather Langenkamp to ask her if he may include her character Nancy in the script, to which she agreed. In interviews with cast and crew in the DVD extras, it is revealed that the original idea for the film centered around the kids separately traveling to a specific location to die by suicide. Later it would be discovered that the common link between the youths was that they dreamed of Freddy Krueger. Since suicide was a taboo social issue, the storyline was abandoned. Some aspects of the idea remained in the film.

In Craven's and Wagner's original script, the characters were somewhat different from what was eventually filmed. Nancy was neither a dream expert nor a mental health professional. Kristen (named Kirsten in this script) only stayed in the institution briefly; she had a father and her mother Elaine was named Alice. Neil's last name was Guinness instead and his character was much younger. Dr. Elizabeth Simms's last name was Maddalena, Taryn White was African-American, Joey Crusel was the one who built the model of a house and had trouble getting around (although he did not use a wheelchair), and Philip Anderson was a thirteen-year-old. Will Stanton's name was originally Laredo, he had long hair, did not use a wheelchair, and was the one who made the clay puppets. This script also described the ranch house where Krueger was born, and that is the house that shows up in the kids' dreams rather than the Elm Street house. Wes Craven specifies the house in his original script to be "an architectural portal to [Freddy's dreamscape]. It is virtually a limitless world of the human psyche in all of its dimensions ... So you can enter this other world through the house or dreams or madness or hallucinations or special psychic states that various people have".

Contrary to the film, Donald Thompson knew from the start that Krueger was real and still alive. Krueger was missing and Nancy wanted to find him. When she finds him, Nancy learns that Krueger is obsessed with finding the house where he was born so he could burn it down. In the original script, there is a romance between Nancy and Neil and they have sex. There are scenes and lines that are reminiscent of the first film. There is no mention that Krueger's mother Amanda had been a nun or that Freddy was born of rape. Both Joey and Roland Kincaid are killed. The deaths in this script were more grotesque; Krueger was not as talkative and he was more vulgar. Freddy is killed by Nancy by using his own glove, not by holy water, and she sees through his shapeshifting trick even though she still dies.

New Line Cinema executives Bob Shaye and Sara Risher did not think Craven's and Wagner's original script would work as a film as it was and needed more work; director Chuck Russell and writer Frank Darabont ultimately rewrote about 70% of it, but the concept of the Dream Warriors as a group was retained throughout the extensive rewrite. In Never Sleep Again: The Elm Street Legacy, Russell states that Craven's original script was darker and more profane, and Rachel Talalay thought that the script seemed like a "$20 million script". Discussing the more humorous elements in the film, Russell said, "I looked at what [series creator] Wes Craven did and said, 'This is absolutely great and terrifying.' But I felt that by the time I came along on 3, the way to go was to make the whole idea of dreams and nightmares into a carnival and go further into the dreams and make Freddy Krueger more outrageous and add more of an element of dark humor. That worked and the series went in that direction from then on."

Both Craven/Wagner's original script and the shooting script featured an extended penultimate scene which hinted that Kristen had succeeded in sending Nancy to the "beautiful dream" - making Nancy a type of "dream guardian" - with Neil Gordon answering "I'm seeing her tonight. That's why I'm in such a rush to get to sleep" in the original script and "Yes. I'm going to see her tonight" in the shooting script when asked by Kristen if he still sees Nancy (post mortem). In the theatrical film, all that remains of this omitted plot element is Kristen saying that she will "dream [Nancy] into a beautiful dream" as she lay dying. This plot element would later be recycled in the Nightmares on Elm Street 1991/92 comic book continuation of the "dream trilogy".

=== Casting ===
Lisa Wilcox and Lezlie Deane, who would respectively be cast as Alice Johnson and Tracy Swan in later installments, have both reported to have auditioned for roles in Dream Warriors previously, with Deane having auditioned for the role of Taryn White (eventually cast with Jennifer Rubin) Patricia Arquette was nearly recast early in the production, but Chuck Russell intervened and convinced the producers to allow her to stay. According to producer Sara Risher, the role that the producers spent the most time interviewing and auditioning for was Marcie (Stacey Alden), the 'sexy nurse' who seemingly seduces Joey (Rodney Eastman) in his dream but turns out to be Freddy. Nurse Marcie, while seducing Joey, was originally supposed to turn into a 'she-Freddy' with Alden wearing Freddy's mask; Roy H. Wagner had second thoughts about this after seeing how 'she-Freddy' looked in practice, stating that "Freddy with breasts, it was too off-kilter". The concept of 'she-Freddy' was substituted with having the nurse shoot prehensile tongues at Joey to trap him and then be switched with Englund-Freddy.

According to Ken Sagoes, the character of Kincaid had been written to be a "young body builder" type, a condition Sagoes did not think he could possibly meet himself, a feeling reinforced after seeing a casting line full of men in better physical shape than him. Having believed it to be futile, Sagoes had earlier had second thoughts about going at all but was convinced to go by his agent. However, Sagoes came into his audition with real life-concerns about catching the bus after his audition and more or less unknowingly channeled his worries about the bus into his audition, causing director Chuck Russell - assuming Sagoes' annoyance to simply be part of his portrayal of the character - to be impressed by the perceived genuine attitude and intensity Sagoes showed as the spunky and hotheaded character he was auditioning for.

In the shooting script, Sally Kellerman was supposed to appear on Dick Cavett's talkshow, but Cavett allegedly handpicked Zsa Zsa Gabor personally after being given the opportunity to choose who he thought should appear in his show and be slaughtered by Freddy. According to Robert Englund, all of her reactions and dialogue were completely improvised:

Ms. Gabor, who was probably just grateful to be asked to appear in a movie again, apparently didn't read the script or bother to do any research on the Nightmare flicks. I guess her agent told her, "I have a job for you," and all she said was "Great. Vhat time zhould I zhow up, dahlink?" not realizing that she was about to throw down with a burnt-to-a-crisp serial killer. During the fake talk show where she's interviewed by Dick Cavett, all her reactions seen on film were 100 percent genuine. She didn't know who the fuck Freddy was, so when I jumped out, she had a mild freak-out.

A Nightmare On Elm Street 3 - Dream Warriors (Original Motion Picture Soundtrack)

Film score by Angelo Badalamenti
- Released: January 1, 1987
- Genre: Film score
- Length: 32:02
- Label: Varèse Sarabande
- Producer: New Line Cinema

Angelo Badalamenti chronology
Blue Velvet (1986)	A Nightmare On Elm Street 3 - Dream Warriors (Original Motion Picture Soundtrack) (1987)	Tough Guys Don't Dance (1987)

Professional ratings
Review scores
Source	Rating
AllMusic	4/5 stars

=== Filming ===
The storyboards for the shooting were supplied by Pete von Sholly. Russell originally hired a cinematographer whom line producer Rachel Talalay perceived to be "Eastern European"; Talalay had the cinematographer fired after he had insulted Penelope Sudrow and replaced him with Roy H. Wagner. The Royce Hall building on the University of California, Los Angeles campus was used for the exteriors of the Westin Hills Psychiatric Hospital, while St. Brendan Catholic Church was used for the church scenes. The scenes in Freddy's boiler room were filmed at a converted warehouse across the street from Los Angeles County Jail. Mark Shostrom, who was also doing work on the set of Evil Dead II, possibly smuggled the Freddy glove used in Dream Warriors and used it as a background prop for one day, explaining why the glove appeared in that film released the same year. The line "welcome to prime time, bitch" was ad libbed by Robert Englund, while Kincaid's line "let's go kick the motherfucker's ass all over dreamland" was similarly ad libbed by Ken Sagoes. The junkyard set featured in both Dream Warriors and its sequel The Dream Master is the only set used in more than one film. The set was built and filmed at the old Los Angeles City Dump (Puente Hills Landfill) at 13130 Crossroads Pkwy S, City of Industry, CA 91746, which was closed in October 31, 2013.

=== Special effects ===
The special effects were created by a team led by Peter Chesney and included Kevin Yagher and Mark Shostrom. For the iconic death scene for Jennifer Caulfield (Sudrow), where her body is hoisted into the air, Shostrom created a dummy of Penelope Sudrow with fully flexible limbs out of fiberglass and urethane and then put a matching wig on the dummy. The team built five fake televisions, each with different functions, with one being equipped with a rubber membrane which a dummy of Freddy's head pushed up through, after which they substituted the dummy with Robert Englund. Another was equipped with the metal arms which included Freddy's fingerblades and vacuum tubes from real televisions. For the death scene of Taryn (Jennifer Rubin), the team had originally tried for an effect where her head explodes after being injected with drugs, but could not make this effect work; instead they put appliances on Jennifer Rubin's body to show the withering effects of the injection.

The skeletal version of the girl that Kristen (Arquette) is holding in the intro sequence played by Kristen Clayton was originally a surreal mechanical corpse dummy created by Shostrom, but turned out to be too good for its purpose; Russell was so unnerved by its appearance that he did not dare to put it in the film, but had it replaced by a simpler "decayed skeleton". Shostrom went to the Simon Wiesenthal museum for inspiration, looking at photographs of burned children from the Auschwitz concentration camp and needed ten weeks to complete the original dummy, and its replacement was created within hours at Russell's insistence. The "Freddy-snake" was a 14 foot long animatronic, radio-controlled serpent built from a smaller miniature model. The serpent was equipped with scales and a lift that could be used to raise its upper body and head.

=== Post-production ===
Heather Langenkamp and co-star Craig Wasson refer to a deleted scene in which they kissed, with Wasson stating that "No, we didn't have sex, but there was this one real hot kiss that just about melted the camera lens. Too bad they cut it".

== Music ==
The theme song, "Dream Warriors", was written and performed by the American heavy metal band Dokken and later included on their album Back for the Attack. The single was a success and a decision was made to include heavy metal songs in the soundtrack of the sequels. The band's manager Cliff Burnstein was acquainted with Wes Craven and was able to obtain a copy of the film script as reference for the lyrics. Robert Englund as Freddy then helped providing unique footage with the band for the music video. Clips of Patricia Arquette as Kristen Parker were also used, with some notable changes such as her model house being built with Dokken fanzines instead of papier-mâché.

The opening sequence of the original VHS release of the film has a hard rock instrumental version of the Joe Lamont song "Quiet Cool". The DVD instead has "Into the Fire" by Dokken which is in the original theatrical release.

A Nightmare on Elm Street 3: Dream Warriors was scored by David Lynch's frequent collaborator and friend Angelo Badalamenti and released around three weeks prior to the film's theatrical release. The film score was rereleased alongside all the other soundtracks in the franchise in 2017 on the label Death Waltz Recording Company as a box set called A Nightmare on Elm Street: Box of Souls.

== Release ==
=== Marketing ===
New Line Cinema's distributing partner Media Home Entertainment recorded a promo reel with Robert Englund as Freddy advertising the VHS release of the film primarily to video rental shop and other vendors, including a promised chance to one winner to appear in the sequel A Nightmare on Elm Street 4: The Dream Master.

== Reception ==
=== Box office ===
The film was released theatrically in the United States by New Line Cinema in February 1987. It was its first film to open nationally, opening in 1,343 theaters and debuting at number one, with a weekend gross of $8.9 million, a record for an independent film at the time. It made $44,793,222 at the domestic box office making it both the highest-grossing film for the studio that year and the 24th highest-grossing film of 1987. It is the third highest-grossing film of the Nightmare on Elm Street franchise after Freddy vs. Jason and A Nightmare on Elm Street 4: The Dream Master. In the UK, the film spent two weeks at the top of the box office.

In the Australian state of Queensland, the movie was banned by the Bjelke-Petersen government because of its drug references, specifically the scene where Freddy's glove becomes a row of syringes and he injects Taryn with an overdose. In 1990, the newly elected Goss government abolished the Queensland Film Board of Review and the film became available through normal market channels. The Australian public at the time thought the ban was absurd, as the film was not considered very graphic.

=== Critical response ===
On Rotten Tomatoes the film holds an approval rating of 69% based on 68 reviews, with an average rating of 5.9/10. The site's critics consensus reads, "A Nightmare on Elm Street 3: Dream Warriors offers an imaginative and surprisingly satisfying rebound for a franchise already starting to succumb to sequelitis." Metacritic, which uses a weighted average, assigned the film a score of 49 out of 100, based on 11 critics, indicating "mixed or average" reviews.

In his review in Cinefantastique, Harry McCracken calls the storyline "dull" and "silly even for the slasher genre" and also criticizes the overexposure of Freddy as killing the tension of the film, but highlights the special effects of the film as its greatest strength, and highlights Bradley Gregg and Jennifer Rubin as the best performances among the young cast.

Variety wrote that Russell's poor direction makes the film's intended and unintended humor difficult to differentiate. Roger Ebert of the Chicago Sun-Times rated it one and a half out of four stars; he liked the production values but said that it "never generated any sympathy for its characters". Janet Maslin of The New York Times wrote, "The film's dream sequences are ingenious, and they feature some remarkable nightmare images and special effects." Kim Newman wrote in Empire that the "film delivers amazing scenes in spades, bringing to life the sort of bizarre images which used to be found only on comic book covers" but believed that Langenkamp was "miscast here as the world's only teenage psychiatrist, and a white streak in her hair doesn't help her get away with it." Kevin Thomas of the Los Angeles Times praised the film's combination of horror and humour, particularly its fantasy sequences, special effects and "throwaway humor".

=== Accolades ===
- 1988 Saturn Awards
  - Best Horror Film (nomination)
  - Best Make-up (nomination)
  - Best Supporting Actor – Robert Englund (nomination)
- Fantasporto Awards 1988
  - International Fantasy Film Award Best Film – Chuck Russell (nomination)
  - Critics Awards: Special Mention – Chuck Russell (won)

== Home media ==
A Nightmare on Elm Street 3: Dream Warriors was released on VHS in the United States by Media Home Entertainment on August 5, 1987. The film entered Billboard's videocassette rental chart that month. On August 27, the Los Angeles Times reported that it had risen from 22nd to 11th place on the chart, although its performance was below industry expectations.

In September 1999, New Line Home Video included the film in a remastered seven-film A Nightmare on Elm Street collection, released on both VHS and DVD. The DVD edition of Dream Warriors, released on September 21, 1999, featured an anamorphic widescreen presentation, Dolby Digital 5.1 and mono audio tracks, production notes and DVD-ROM features.

The film was released on Blu-ray by Warner Home Video on September 27, 2011, in a double-feature edition with A Nightmare on Elm Street 2: Freddy's Revenge.

On September 30, 2025, Warner Bros. Home Entertainment released the film on Ultra HD Blu-ray in the United States as part of a seven-film A Nightmare on Elm Street 4K collection.

In the United Kingdom, the film was classified for home-video release in 1988 and released on DVD in 2001. The film was included in the 2011 Blu-ray collection and the 2025 4K collection. In France, the film was released on DVD in 2007, with seven mini-documentaries and Dokken's Dream Warriors music video. In Italy, the film was released on DVD through the Italian magazine Panorama in 2006, with both English and Italian audio options available.

In Japan, the film was released on DVD in 2004 with documentaries, trailers and the Dokken music video as special features. The film was re-released as a budget DVD in 2009 and was included in a 4K collection in 2025.

== Legacy ==
Dream Warriors has been cited as an influence on subsequent horror films and television series. Clive Barker invoked Dream Warriors when discussing the expanded scope of Hellbound: Hellraiser II (1988), comparing the sequel's greater emphasis on adventure and special effects to Dream Warriors and saying that Hellbound was "more akin to 'Dream Warriors' in its roller-coaster aspect".

Director Josh Boone named it among the principal influences on The New Mutants (2020), while The Midnight Club (2022) co-creator Leah Fong stated that Dream Warriors was screened at the first meeting of the series' writers' room and described it as "very influential" on the show.

Filmmaker Damien Leone has cited Dream Warriors as an influence on Terrifier 2 (2022). Leone stated that he deliberately sought a Dream Warriors-like tone for the sequel, using the film as a reference point when expanding the supernatural and fantasy elements of the Terrifier series.

Dream Warriors was also among the formative films that influenced Jane Schoenbrun's Teenage Sex and Death at Camp Miasma (2026). Schoenbrun particularly praised its ensemble of institutionalized young characters who meet within their dreams and assume empowered alternate identities.

Director Chuck Russell later regarded the film as a turning point in the characterization of Freddy Krueger. Russell said that he persuaded New Line Cinema to introduce more humour and more elaborate dream imagery, describing Dream Warriors as partly a "superhero prototype". He noted that subsequent installments developed Freddy's wisecracking personality even further.

In 2019, the Dream Warriors cinematographer Roy H. Wagner re-created scenes from the film — with Kristen Parker and the 'little girl' she saw in her dreams — while using only an iPhone 11 Pro for the production; in this re-creation Kristen is played by actress Taylor Kalupa, while YouTuber iJustine also got a shot at playing Kristen as a stand-in in her own behind-the-scenes feature of Wagner's project.

== Other media ==
=== Film ===
In the franchise, Westin Hills Psychiatric Hospital and the dream-suppressing fictional drug Hypnocil introduced in Dream Warriors reappears in Freddy vs. Jason (2003), where it is shown that prolonged use of the drug results in irreversible coma. In the film, the drug has been used by Springwood's leadership to quarantine anyone who have had nightmares of Freddy Krueger, sending them to Westin Hills and prevent them from spreading the fear and knowledge of his existence to the outside world. The drug appears in the film Stitches (2012), where the main character Tommy (Tommy Knight) takes a drug by that name to suppress visions of the undead killer clown Stitches (Ross Noble). An earlier screenplay by Michael Almereyda for what became Freddy's Dead: The Final Nightmare (1991) involved bringing back members of the Dream Warriors as a form of "dream police" to help Jacob Johnson in fighting Freddy.

=== Literature ===
The film was spoofed by MAD magazine in October 1987. A joint novelization of the first three films, The Nightmares on Elm Street Parts 1, 2, 3: The Continuing Story, was released in 1987, written by Jeffrey Cooper. In the Dream Warriors chapter, the original Craven and Wagner version of the Nightmare 3 script is adapted, rather than the Russell and Frank Darabont rewrite. As such, the book version of the story is notably different from the finished film.

=== Comics ===
Many characters from the Dream Warriors film appear in Andy Mangels' 1991 comic book story Nightmares on Elm Street which continues the "Dream Trilogy" and brings back most characters from Dream Warriors, with the Dream Warriors group sans Kristen appearing in the last two issues of the series. In the storyline, Kristen's psychic powers and her wish of putting Nancy into a "beautiful dream" allowed Nancy's soul to ascend to the positive side of the dream world, wherein her soul is free and able to oppose Freddy. Aside from Nancy and the Dream Warriors group, Nancy's father Donald, Dr. Simms and Dr. Neil Gordon also appear and Amanda Krueger is mentioned. In the 2009 comic book series Freddy vs. Jason vs. Ash: The Nightmare Warriors, Dr. Neil Gordon plays a major role while Nancy, Amanda Krueger and the Dream Warriors group makes cameo appearances after Jacob Johnson releases some of the spirits of Freddy Krueger's victims to help in defeating Freddy. In the comics, Maggie Burroughs/Katherine Krueger taunts Dr. Neil Gordon for being a "Hypnocil junkie" and that if he hadn't been, he would have seen her betrayal and corruption by her demonic father coming. In the 1989 comics Freddy Krueger's A Nightmare on Elm Street by Marvel Comics, the Westin Hills Psychiatric Hospital and the drug Hypnocil are both featured, with the comics taking place in 1990, referring to the death of four patients and an intern (Nancy Thompson) as a scandal that happened three years prior; in the comics, it is hinted that several among the hospital's management were forced to resign as a consequence of the events of the film.

=== Video games ===
Screenshot of the Commodore 64/IBM-PC game, showing the Dream Warriors characters (with Joey having been kidnapped by Freddy as in the film)

The two video games released for the franchise, the Commodore 64/IBM-PC (1989) and the NES adaption (1990), are independently based primarily on the Dream Warriors concept, characters, and film. The C64/IBM-PC game allows the player to play as one of the Dream Warriors characters, including Nancy who, unique to the game, has a "dream power" of freezing enemies. The NES game centers around collecting Freddy's scattered bones to destroy them (bury them in the original game concept) and Dream Warrior powers can be acquired through collecting power-ups. In Friday the 13th: The Game, from the Friday the 13th franchise, the "Tommy Tapes" hints at Tommy Jarvis being sent to Westin Hills Psychiatric Hospital, to be cared for by Dr. Neil Gordon.

=== Board games ===
Two board games of the franchise, titled A Nightmare on Elm Street: The Game (Victory Games, 1987) and A Nightmare on Elm Street: The Freddy Game (Cardinal, 1989), were released in the 1980's; as with the two video games, they were based primarily on the Dream Warriors film and concept.

=== Merchandise ===
Fright-Rags has released several limited edition Dream Warriors-themed clothing, including one design that is a pastiche of the cover of the first 1963 issue of Uncanny X-Men, substituting the X-Men with the Dream Warriors and Magneto with Freddy Krueger. They have also released a print inspired by their own earlier work on The Warriors (1979) design. Mondo created a printing for MondoCon 2016 based on the 1428 Elm Street house from the film. NECA released an adaptable 7 inch Freddy Krueger figure from the film in 2016 and another 18 inch figure in 2017. Sets including Elaine Parker's severed head and "Tuxedo Freddy" and of Kristen being devoured by the Freddy-snake were released as part of the Cinema of Fear series. A sleeping pill named Dream Warrior has been released, with one function being advertised as "Battle Sleeplessness" and promises the user to “Win Back Your Dreams”. A replica of Nancy Thompson's personal Hypnocil bottle from the film is one of the items released in the January 2018 Bam! Horror Box.

== See also ==
- List of ghost films
- List of monster movies
