= Nightmares on Elm Street =

Comic book series set in the "A Nightmare on Elm Street" universe

Publication information
- Publisher: Innovation Publishing
- Schedule: Bimonthly
- Format: Limited
- Genre: Dark fantasy, horror
- Publication date: September 1991 – July 1992
- No. of issues: 6
- Main character(s): Freddy Krueger; Nancy Thompson; Alice Johnson

Creative team
- Created by: Wes Craven; Bruce Wagner; William Kotzwinkle; Brian Helgeland; Leslie Bohem; (characters and concepts)
- Written by: Andy Mangels
- Pencillers: Tony Harris (1-2); Patrick Rolo (3-6)
- Inker: Ray Kryssing
- Letterer: Vickie Williams
- Colorist: Thomas F. O'Connor
- Editor: David Campiti

Nightmares on Elm Street is a six-issue comic book limited series set within the A Nightmare on Elm Street franchise, set chronologically between A Nightmare on Elm Street 5: The Dream Child (1989) and Freddy's Dead: The Final Nightmare (1991) .It was written by comic book writer Andy Mangels and published bimonthly throughout 1991 and 1992 by Innovation Publishing. The first two issues mainly revolve around Nancy Thompson's fate following her murder by Freddy Krueger in A Nightmare on Elm Street 3: Dream Warriors, while issue three through six deals primarily with the return of Alice Johnson and her son Jacob to Springwood.

== Plot ==
Set in 1990, Cybil Houch has nightmares about Freddy Krueger in which she recognizes 1428 Elm Street, the old house of her former college roommate Nancy Thompson. She is a "ripperologist", and as such Freddy poses as Jack the Ripper in her nightmares. Freddy also invades the dream of Priscilla Martin, a third roommate of Nancy and Cybil, and murders her. Looking for Nancy in phonebooks turns up nothing for Cybil, but Dr. Elizabeth Simms is able to explain to her that Nancy died three years ago, and that Dr. Neil Gordon might know more. Cybil calls him. Rising up, she faints from sudden blood pressure drop and starts dreaming and has to watch as Freddy kills her boyfriend James, but before Freddy can kill her too, Nancy intervenes and saves her. (Note: Andy Mangels (w), Tony Harris (p), Vickie Williams (i), David Campiti (ed). "Yours Truly, Freddy Krueger" Nightmares on Elm Street, vol. 1, no. 1 (September 1991). Innovation Publishing.)

In the real world, Dr. Gordon had reacted to Cybil's phonecall alluding to Freddy Krueger and arrives to help her, allowing Cybil to tell him about her encounter with Nancy. They enter Cybil's dreams, where Nancy explains that because of Kristen Parker's dream powers, she died in body three years ago but her soul was set free to ascend into "the Beautiful Dream", a domain of the dream world that Freddy cannot control, and that she has hidden Neil's dreams from Freddy to protect him. The two women conclude that Freddy has likely used Cybil and Priscilla as bait to lure Nancy out of safety. After some dangerous encounters with Freddy in the dream world, they are saved by a girl who claims that Cybil will be her mother, meaning that she is pregnant. The comic reveals that there is a third dream plane where unborn children spend their time dreaming. The "dream children" attack Freddy, lambasting him for trying to take Jacob earlier and declaring that Freddy doesn't belong there. However, Cybil passes out again from morning sickness and immediately has another nightmare where "Jack the Ripper" attacks her with a scalpel as she calls out in vain for Nancy to help her again. (Note: Andy Mangels (w), Tony Harris (p), Vickie Williams (i), David Campiti (ed). "Eternal Evil" Nightmares on Elm Street, vol. 1, no. 2 (November 1991). Innovation Publishing.)

In 1995, six years after the events of A Nightmare on Elm Street 5: The Dream Child, Alice Johnson returns to Springwood, bringing Jacob with her, who is portrayed as possessing both a heightened intellect and maturity and psychic powers such as telepathy. Her father Dennis (called Fred here) has died, hinted to be due to Freddy. It is revealed through dialogue that during this time, Cybil had died of eclampsia, while Dr. Gordon as her driver suffered a car accident trying to rush her to the hospital. He has now been rendered comatose and keeps dreaming of Freddy trying to kill him, but Nancy keeps on protecting him. Most of Elm Street is boarded up and vacant, with one more house now joining that state. Alice meets up with her old friend Yvonne Miller from The Dream Child, who's now a policewoman. Devonne Gable, a mysterious, traumatized woman, is working for Freddy, who is after Jacob again, but he rescues Alice when Freddy tries to manipulate Dan Jordan to trick her. Jacob then meets up with Devonne. (Note: Andy Mangels (w), Patrick Rolo (p), Ray Kryssing (i), David Campiti (ed). "Loose Ends Pt. 1: Return To Springwood" Nightmares on Elm Street, vol. 1, no. 3 (December 1991). Innovation Publishing.)

Jacob and Devonne head to the Springwood cemetery, where Dan's body is buried, as are Devonne's parents and sister. Jacob tries to use his powers to bring Dan back, but senses that Freddy still has his soul. Jacob "zaps" Devonne and goes into her dreams of her childhood trauma, where he finds Freddy. Freddy tries to coerce Jacob into helping him escape the confines of Springwood in return for Freddy bringing Dan back to life, even allowing him some "father-son" time with his father Dan Jordan's soul. Meanwhile, Freddy sends Devonne out to kill Alice, who had searched out Yvonne at the hospital for help in finding Jacob. They try to enlist the help of Nancy's spirit by speaking to Neil Gordon's comatose body, which Jacob sensed earlier was being protected by Nancy. (Note: Andy Mangels (w), Patrick Rolo (p), Ray Kryssing (i), Thomas F. O'Connor (col), David Campiti (ed). "Loose Ends Part 2: Dead Men Telling Tales" Nightmares on Elm Street, vol. 1, no. 4 (March 1992). Innovation Publishing.)

Alice's words stir Neil's body, who says she needs to go into the dream world to link up with Nancy. Alice convinces Yvonne to drug her unconscious. Devonne enters the hospital only moments after with a machinegun, slaughtering her way to get to Alice, but Yvonne shoots her fatally in the chest before she can kill Alice. In the dream world, Alice meets up with Neil. Freddy tries to kill them by shattering all the glass in the "dream church" from the films, but Nancy saves them. In the dream world, Alice becomes her namesake Alice in Wonderland and encounters Freddy as a macabre version of the White Rabbit, while Nancy is interrupted by her father Donald's spirit. Neil joins up with his former patients, the "Dream Warriors", who reside in a sort of pocket universe within the dream world. Jacob encounters his father Dan Jordan's spirit in the dream world. (Note: Andy Mangels (w), Patrick Rolo (p), Ray Kryssing (i), Thomas F. O'Connor (col), David Campiti (ed). "Bang Bang: Devonne's Silver Hammer" Nightmares on Elm Street, vol. 1, no. 5 (May 1992). Innovation Publishing.)

Devonne enters a "dying dream" state and rejoins Freddy in the dream world. Dan explains that Freddy will bring him back if Jacob helps Freddy escape the confines of Springwood. Donald shoots Nancy in the head due to Freddy's torment being too horrible for him to endure, and if he were to agree to kill his daughter, Freddy might release him from his bondage. Nancy however restores herself and says that she's changed, and that she can offer him his salvation. She frees the aspect of him that Freddy had imprisoned and sends his now complete spirit off to some unknown plane and continues. Alice goes through more Alice in Wonderland-themed vistas, and is eventually overpowered by Freddy in the guise of the Jabberwocky, while Neil leaves the Dream Warriors' pocket dimension and continues. Nancy tries to talk Jacob out of helping Freddy, pointing out that he was the one who killed Dan in the first place, but she has now entered Freddy's place and he now has power over her too. Devonne, finally realizing that Freddy was never going to keep his word and that she was only ever a pawn to him, turns against him and sides with Neil, Nancy and Dan in attacking Freddy. After Freddy's temporary defeat, Jacob uses his psychic powers to put his father Dan's spirit into Neil Gordon's body, who had rather wanted to join Nancy in "the Beautiful Dream". The three prepare to leave Springwood for good, with Alice asking Yvonne to come with them and leave the nightmares behind for good. Freddy is shown to reconstitute himself in the last panel. (Note: Andy Mangels (w), Patrick Rolo (p), Ray Kryssing (i), David Campiti (ed). "If I Should Die Before My Wake" Nightmares on Elm Street, vol. 1, no. 6 (July 1992). Innovation Publishing.)

== Characters ==
- Freddy Krueger - The central character of the franchise. His main agenda in the comics is to draw Nancy Thompson out into his own place of strength, and later to use Jacob Johnson to bring him out of the dream world and escape the geographic restrictions to Springwood that he's saddled with, using Devonne as his agent in the physical world to accomplish the latter goal.
- Nancy Thompson - The franchise's original heroine and final girl of A Nightmare on Elm Street (1984). She was killed by Freddy in the sequel, but because of Kristen Parker's dream powers, her soul escaped his clutches and became a sort of "dream guardian" of the positive side of the dream world. In extended interviews on the franchise documentary Never Sleep Again: The Elm Street Legacy, Andy Mangels explains that "Nancy is still alive in the "Beautiful Dream". She's essentially the polar opposite of Freddy. If Freddy represented nightmares and all that was evil, all that could harm you in dreams, Nancy represented all the things that were good and all the things that you can hope for to have in a dream. She actually became the protector within the dream world". The comic shows that after the events of the first film, she was sent to a psychiatric institution, and moved away from Springwood before Freddy could return. She went on to study psychology in college in between the aforementioned films.
- Alice Johnson - Nancy's successor as the franchise's heroine, the titular "Dream Master" and the only protagonist to survive Freddy twice. She became the final girl of A Nightmare on Elm Street 4: The Dream Master (1988) after Freddy murders Kristen Parker, whose psychic dream powers she inherits. After the events of A Nightmare on Elm Street 5: The Dream Child (1989), she and Jacob moved away from Springwood before Freddy could return and kill her. She is portrayed as a blond in the comics, as in The Dream Child, though Devonne refers to her as being a redhead, as she was in The Dream Master. Both the Nightmares on Elm Street comics and the short story Dead Highway, Lost Roads has Freddy putting Alice through various Alice's Adventures in Wonderland-themed scenarios, where Alice herself predictably plays the role of the eponymous Alice in Wonderland.
- Jacob Daniel Johnson - Alice Johnson and Dan Jordan's son, and the titular "Dream Child". He is described as being five year old, but Yvonne notices a maturity in his language and choice of words that would imply that he is mentally around twice his biological age. Alice claims he has always been like that, and concludes that it must be an inadvertent effect of Freddy's tamperings with him while he was still in the womb. The characterization of Jacob having various psychic powers would later be used again in the novel A Nightmare on Elm Street: Perchance to Dream.
- Yvonne Miller - Alice's surviving friend from The Dream Child. She was a volunteer nurse in the film, but is now working as a police officer as well.
- Devonne Gable - The secondary antagonist, officially dubbed the "Springwood Killer". A traumatized woman with a troubled childhood, Devonne and her family lived on Elm Street before the lynching and official disappearance of Fred Krueger, but her father was hotheaded and abusive towards her and her sister Denise, whom he accidentally kills in anger. After this, Devonne sets off the gas in the house, but her plan to get rid of her hated father also kills her mother who lights a cigarette and inadvertently blows up their house. A still human Fred Krueger, his wife Loretta and daughter Kathryn were among the spectators gathered to watch the disaster she caused on their street. As a dream demon, Freddy preys upon her tormented memories, mixing truth with lies and has broken her enough through her nightmares that she will serve him out of fear, providing him with an important agent outside the dream world. Due to Freddy's tamperings, she's cursed to see every person resembling the burned, skinless cadavers she last saw her parents as after the fire.
- Cybil Houch - Former college roommate of Nancy Thompson. Cybil is a "ripperologist", obsessing over everything related to Jack the Ripper. James is Cybil's boyfriend, with whom she is unknowingly expecting a daughter. Freddy kills him by dropping him into a gigantic printing press in the dream world as she watches, whereafter Freddy immediately prints headlines announcing his demise to her.
- Priscilla Martin - The third roommate of Nancy and Cybil. Priscilla is a fashion designer whom Freddy kills in a catwalk-themed nightmare. Her formerly "hunky boyfriend" Max has since become an overweight trans woman; Freddy kills her too in Priscilla's nightmare. Mangels explains that (on Priscilla's death) "her fears concerned her first big show as a fashion designer and losing her lover. Freddy takes those fears and manipulates them in her dreams and creates for her a world that's everything she fears." Cybil and Priscilla were featured briefly in the fan film Don't Fall Asleep: The Film in 2016, depicting part of Nancy's time in college. (Note: 3 Count & Go (September 5, 2016). Don't Fall Asleep: The Film – via YouTube.)
- Dr. Elizabeth Simms - The surviving senior psychiatrist from Dream Warriors; she now works at Fairview, a sister institution to the Westin Hills Psychiatric Hospital. She answers a phone call from Cybil, and, unlike in Dream Warriors, understands the implications of Cybil mentioning her recent nightmares. Freddy uses a faux Dr. Simms in a nightmare scenario (of an unknown Fairview patient) visited by Nancy and Cybil, and appears to kill her in it.
- Dr. Neil Gordon - The other surviving psychiatrist from Dream Warriors. He no longer works at Westin Hills, but does work with sleep disorders. He becomes comatose due to a car crash sometime in the five year time skip between the events of issues 2 and 3.
- Daniel 'Dan' Jordan - Alice Johnson's high school sweetheart and Jacob's father. He was murdered by Freddy in The Dream Child, and Freddy later reacquired his soul and is trying to force Dan to help him in enlisting Jacob's prodigious talents. When Dan acts on Freddy's behalf, out of fear, he is portrayed as turning into the "cyborg" version from his death scene, indicating that Freddy has enthralled his spirit.
- Donald Thompson - Nancy Thompson's father. He was killed in the physical world in Dream Warriors by Freddy's reanimated skeleton. Freddy has acquired his soul too, and has been tormenting him long enough for Donald to agree to kill Nancy in the dream world in return for the torture to stop.
- The Dream Warriors - Roland Kincaid, Phillip Anderson, Jennifer Caufield, Will Stanton and Taryn White, five of the seven Elm Street killed by Freddy through Dream Warriors and The Dream Master; Kristen Parker and Joey are not shown among the five. The group explains to Neil Gordon that some who are killed by Freddy ends up in such a "limbo", while others move on to some other plane of existence. According to Mangels, he choose to portray them as a faux "superhero team" existing within a pocket dimension in the dream world which is reachable through Jennifer, who serves as the gatekeeper to anyone from the outside. Mangels took each of their deaths to expand upon it and showed how they might have developed as a "dream warrior"; for instance, Jennifer is shown to be a head inside a floating television which acts as the portal into their pocket dimension, while Will is in his "Wizard Master" garb.

== Development ==
Nightmares on Elm Street was Andy Mangels's third and first successful attempt to release comics within the A Nightmare on Elm Street franchise. The first was for Blackthorne Publishing, which gained licensing rights from New Line Cinema in early 1989. Eight issues in 3D based on the films and Freddy's Nightmares were planned, and a first issue was scheduled for release in April 1989, but around that time, Blackthorne began its downward spiral towards bankruptcy, and progress was frozen long enough for the publisher to fold before anything could be published of those comics. Andy Mangels had finished writing three and illustrated the first issue, but development ceased after that. The second attempt was with Marvel Comics' Freddy Krueger's A Nightmare on Elm Street series; Andy Mangels suggested a plot for its fifth issue but only two issues were released before it was cancelled out of fear of what critics might say about its violent content. After the box office failure of A Nightmare on Elm Street 5: The Dream Child (1989), New Line Cinema decided to pull the plug on the film series, which they did in 1991 with Freddy's Dead: The Final Nightmare, which officially killed off Freddy for the time. Andy Mangels attempted to once again secure comics publishing rights for the A Nightmare on Elm Street franchise, and succeeded within eight months. Dave Imhoff, who was head of New Line Cinema's licensing department at the time, had recognized comics as a cheap way of developing stories within a franchise without having to employ actors, film crew and special effects specialists. Thus, he was very receptive when Mangels approached him and expressed willingness to work on developing A Nightmare on Elm Street comics. Mangels also contacted Innovation Publishing, who told him that they might consider publishing his work if he could only secure licensing rights.

The comic uses the concept of "the Beautiful Dream", referenced in the A Nightmare on Elm Street 3: Dream Warriors film only through words spoken by Kristen Parker, but in Wes Craven and Bruce Wagner's original script, another penultimate scene was present in which Kristen asks Neil Gordon (after Nancy's death) if the two still see each other and Gordon responds: "Yeah, we do. In fact, I'm seeing her tonight. That's why I'm in such a rush to get to sleep". This was also in the final script, but was omitted for the film.

The comic also references another omitted concept known as the "dream pool(s)", originating from an unused screenplay for A Nightmare on Elm Street 5: The Dream Child written by Craig Spector and John Skipp. Spector explains that the concept of the dream pool is a “purely Jungian notion, this place in the collective unconscious where everybody’s dreams link up. The unconscious is the back door to the mind, and the back door can swing both ways. If Freddy can get into people’s dreams via that door, it would be possible for Alice to get into Freddy’s dreams via the same route, and therefore into his past”. Spector elaborates that “The way we presented the dream pool was to have Freddy like an oil slick floating on the surface, a black, eternal force that needs to get back to the physical realm because that’s where the action is”. According to Michael De Luca, the dream pool concept was dropped as it made the story of The Dream Child too convoluted and with too much backstory. The dream pool concept was also used in the short story "Dead Highway, Lost Roads" (1991) by Philip Nutman in the non-canonical anthology book The Nightmares on Elm Street: Freddy Krueger's Seven Sweetest Dreams; Nutman had also been the author of the Fangoria article from 1989 in which Spector explained his idea of the concept.

Andy Mangels wrote his own fear of having his hand pierced by a sewing machine into the comics, for the death of seamstress Priscilla Martin, whom Freddy kills in a catwalk/fashion-themed nightmare. Mangels elaborates that "he utilizes her fears to destroy and does so with her sewing machine - the one thing she was not afraid of, in exactly the manner of my phobia."

== Reception ==
Gavin Jasper on Den of Geek criticized the plot twists of both substories, of the pregnant Cybil being apparently murdered by Freddy as Jack the Ripper and of Dan Jordan inhabiting the body of Neil Gordon - in spite of the latter being a happy ending - of being absurd even by A Nightmare on Elm Street standards, but commended Devonne's character for "[bringing] some life into an otherwise lifeless cast". In GoreZone, James Vance expressed that Andy Mangels did a competent job in the characterizations, but thought that many characters did not particularly resemble the actors who portrayed them in the films, but attributes this to licensing departments not always getting approval for portraying the likeness of every actor from the films.

Lewis "Linkara" Lovhaug states that the off-panel killing of Cybil's character and never mentioning her again makes the first two issues a waste, since the "Beautiful Dream" is explained all over again in the following issues; he also compares Cybil to Tina Gray in being a false protagonist to Nancy. He calls Patrick Rolo's art in issue 3-6 an improvement over Tony Harris' art in issue 1 and 2, stating that Harris had a more dreamlike style that worked well for the dreams but came off as too surreal outside of the dream world, while Rolo's more general art worked better for the non-dream scenes. Linkara also criticized the use of the Dream Warriors, saying their appearance was mere fan service and excessive exposition that served no real narrative purpose in the story, as Neil Gordon simply enters their domain, talks to them and then leaves. Similar to Jasper, Linkara also commended Devonne's storyline as the best in the comic series.

Matt Molgaard on Horror Novels Reviews calls the series an "amazing tale" but still feels that there was more to tell, questioning why the story was so abruptly cut off between issue 2 and 3; he also states that the lush colors are a welcome addition after the black-and-white Marvel Comics' Freddy Krueger's A Nightmare on Elm Street comics he reviewed previously. Mike Mitchell on Geek Nerdery also expressed similar sentiments about the abruptness of the first storyline's ending, but appreciates that Alice and Jacob's was continued and completed, while also giving Neil and Nancy a happy ending.

Similarly to Linkara, Cecil A. Laird of The Horror Show also expresses that the writers essentially gave the first two issues an Alien 3 treatment with doing a significant timeskip while only explaining the outcome of issue 2 in text and not mentioning Cybil again. Laird and Jaime En Fuego praise Tony Harris' "painterly style" of the first two issues, saying that the style is very different from any other A Nightmare on Elm Street comic they had seen. They also notice that the comics are littered with other "easter eggs, such as the powerplant and man-faced dog from Freddy's Revenge, the wheelchair from Dream Warriors and the pram from The Dream Child, saying that it "expands upon the world and mythology [of A Nightmare on Elm Street] surprisingly well" and makes for an "easy extension" of the film series.
