= Rodney Eastman =

Canadian actor

- Born: July 20, 1967 (age 59); Montreal, Quebec, Canada
- Occupation: Actor
- Years active: 1986–present

Rodney Eastman (born July 20, 1967) is a Canadian actor best known for his role of Joey Crusel in A Nightmare on Elm Street 3: Dream Warriors and A Nightmare on Elm Street 4: The Dream Master. He is also a musician in a band named King Straggler with fellow actors John Hawkes and Brentley Gore. The band resides in Los Angeles, California.

== Life and career ==
Eastman was born in Montreal in 1967 and moved with his family to Los Angeles when he was five. Deciding while he was attending Schurr High School in Montebello, California that he wanted to be an actor, he studied drama and appeared in numerous high school productions. After graduating, he landed his first job as an extra in the television musical Have You Tried Talking to Patty? Eastman has starred in several films, and his best-known film role is in the 1987 hit horror film A Nightmare on Elm Street 3: Dream Warriors as Joey Crusel. In 1988, he reprised his role in the sequel A Nightmare on Elm Street 4: The Dream Master. His other films include Deadly Weapon, Mobsters, The Opposite of Sex and Knight to F4.

Eastman also made many guest appearances on television shows, including Highway to Heaven, Charles in Charge, Melrose Place, CSI: Crime Scene Investigation, Babylon 5 (as Kiron Maray in season one episode "The War Prayer", 1994), as Sammael in season one episode 18 of Chris Carter's Millennium, The Protector, Renegade, ER and Sliders. He also appeared as Lee Skelling on The Mentalist.

== Filmography ==
Year	Title	Role	Notes
1986	Chopping Mall	Shoplifter	Uncredited
1987	A Nightmare on Elm Street 3: Dream Warriors	Joey Crusel	
1988	Broken Angel	Billy	TV movie
1988	A Nightmare on Elm Street 4: The Dream Master	Joey Crusel	
1989	Beverly Hills Bodysnatchers	Freddy	
1989	Deadly Weapon	Zeke	
1989	The Preppie Murder	Jersey	TV movie
1991	Flight of Black Angel	Bobby Gordon	TV movie
1991	Mobsters	Joey	
1993	Hear No Evil	Interviewed Kid	Uncredited
1996	No One Would Tell	Tony Dinardo	TV movie
1997	Dead Men Can't Dance	David Porter	
1998	The Opposite of Sex	Ty	
1998	Tourist Trap	Stork	TV movie
1999	Clubland	Mondo	
1999	Random Acts of Violence	Drug Dealer	
1999	Blue Ridge Fall	Aaron Perkins	
2000	The Dancer	Isaac	
2000	Sand	Baker	
2001	The Caveman's Valentine	Matthew	
2002	Con Express	Ricky	Video
2003	Freddy vs. Jason	Joey	Archive footage, special thanks
2004	Sawtooth	Christian	
2008	Fix	Crackhead	
2008	Rule of three	Russ	
2009	The Resurrection of Officer Rollins	Ralph	Short
2010	Spork	Spit	
2010	I Spit on Your Grave	Andy Chirensky	
2010	Sheeps and Wolves	Wolf	Short
2010	Janie Jones	Billy	
2010	The Black Belle	Rodney Eastman	
2010	Never Sleep Again: The Elm Street Legacy	Himself	Documentary
2012	Extracted	Eric	
2013	By the Time You Read This	Driver	
2014	Camouflage	Galvin	
2016	Foreign Land	Mr. James	
2016	Hoax	The Man	Short
2017	Sable	Andres	
2019	Getting the Kinks Out	Harold	
Unreleased	William Froste	Phillip Ciarelli	

=== Television ===
Year	Title	Role	Notes
1986	CBS Schoolbreak Special	Uncredited	Episode: "Have You Tried Talking to Patty?" (3.02)
1987	Highway to Heaven	Kevin	Episode: "Parents' Day" (3.21)
1987	Starman	Eric Kendall	Episode: "Fathers and Sons" (1.19)
1988	Who's the Boss?	Boy #1	Episode: "Sam's Car" (5.01)
1989	TV 101	Derek	Episode: "Clicks" (1.09)
1989	CBS Summer Playhouse	Steve Cabell	Episode: "Curse of the Corn People" (3.07)
1989	Jake and the Fatman	Eric McGinn	Episode: "Dancing in the Dark" (3.05)
1990	Baywatch	Teenager	Episode: "The Big Race" (1.19)
1990	Against the Law	Richey Littlefield	Episode: "Pilot" (1.01)
1989- 1990	Charles in Charge	Bobby Nijinsji / Danny Holland	2 episodes (4.25, 5.23)
1990	Hull High	Richard Stoltz	2 episodes (#1.1, #1.5)
1991	Parker Lewis Can't Lose	Jimmy Joe Trout	Episode: "A Walk on the Dark Side" (2.02)
1993	FBI: The Untold Stories		Episode: "The Miller Extortion" (2.11)
1993	Bodies of Evidence	J.J.	Episodes: "Endangered Species" (2.07)
1994	Babylon 5	Kiron Maray	Episode: "The War Prayer" (1.07)
1994	Touched by an Angel	Craig	Episode: "Cassie's Choice" (1.05)
1994	Murder, She Wrote	Jeff Delagre	Episode: "Fatal Paradise" (11.07)
1995	University Hospital	Ryan Harrison	Episodes: "'Til Death Do Us Part" (1.08)
1995	Cybill	Greg	Episode: "The Big Sleep Over" (1.12)
1993-1995	Diagnosis: Murder	Jimmy Stevens / Ben	2 episodes (1.05, 3.02)
1996	ER	Fredd	Episode: "The Match Game" (2.17)
1996	Sliders	Byron	Episode: "The Dream Masters" (3.05)
1996	Renegade	Trike	Episode: "God's Mistake" (5.05)
1996	Dangerous Minds	Mike Jensen	Episode: "Bad Apple" (1.04)
1997	Millennium	Sammael	Episode: "Powers, Principalities, Thrones and Dominions" (1.19)
1997	Nash Bridges	Miles	Episode: "Lost and Found" (3.01)
1998	Party of Five	Dave	Episode: "Separation Anxiety" (5.02)
1999	Melrose Place	Ricky G.	4 episodes
2000	NYPD Blue	Tommy	Episode: "The Man with Two Right Shoes" (7.03)
2000	The Huntress		Episode: "Surprise Party" (1.05)
2000	The X-Files	Ronald Purnell	Episode: "Invocation" (8.05)
2001	The Beast		Episode: "The Price" (1.01)
2001	Dead Last	Jimmy Swain	Episode: "The Crawford Touch" (1.12)
2003	Threat Matrix	Billy	2 episodes (1.03, 1.04)
2004	Touching Evil	Jack	Episode: "K" (1.06)
2006	CSI: NY	Clark Kranen	Episode: "Super Men" (2.19)
2006	Cold Case	Arthur Pool - 1945	Episode: "The Hen House" (3.21)
2006	Shark	Charlie Davis	Episode: "Déjà Vu All Over Again" (1.07)
2007	Crossing Jordan	Homeless Guy	Episode: "In Sickness & in Health" (6.14)
2007	Saving Grace	Carl Sperry	Episode: "Keep Your Damn Wings Off My Nephew" (1.04)
2007	Cane	Dan	2 episodes (1.01, 1,08)
2007	Criminal Minds	Stephen Foley	Episode: "Birthright" (3.11)
2009	Without a Trace	Grady McBride	Episode: "Chameleon" (7.15)
2009	The Mentalist	Lee Skelling	Episode: "Carnelian, Inc." (1.17)
2009	Monk	Del Johnston	Episode: "Mr. Monk Goes Camping" (8.12)
2010	Rizzoli & Isles	Mo Monee	Episode: "She Works Hard for the Money" (1.04)
2011	Breakout Kings	Mars O'Connell	Episode: "Fun with Chemistry" (1.07)
2011	The Protector	Gale Carson	Episode: "Revisions" (1.05)
2011	Bones	Ricky Duval	Episode: "The Memories in the Shallow Grave" (7.01)
2013	NCIS	Wendell Kraiser	Episode: "Alibi" (11.8)
2014	Longmire	Creeley Dorn	Episode: "Wanted Man" (3.05)
2001, 2015	Investigation	Jacob Warren / Keith Driscoll	2 episodes (2.10, 15.14)
2015	Ambient	Striker	
2015	NCIS: Los Angeles	Jimmie Ray Easton	Episode: "Rage" (6.20)
