= Alice Johnson (A Nightmare on Elm Street) =

Fictional character in the A Nightmare on Elm Street franchise

- A Nightmare on Elm Street character
- Lisa Wilcox as Alice Johnson
- First appearance: A Nightmare on Elm Street 4: The Dream Master
- Created by: William Kotzwinkle; Brian Helgeland
- Portrayed by: Lisa Wilcox (Note: A girl played by Kristen Clayton appears in Kristen Parker's dreams in both Dream Warriors and The Dream Master and refers to herself as Alice in the latter, although it's never explained how or if she relates to the character of Alice Johnson.)

In-universe information
- Full name: Alice Johnson
- Occupation: High school student (former); Waitress
- Fighting style: Karate
- Family: Dennis Johnson (father); Rick Johnson (twin brother; (Note: Never Sleep Again: The Elm Street Legacy (Robert Englund, Heather Langenkamp, Wes Craven, Lisa Wilcox, Alice Cooper, Andrew Kasch, Daniel Farrands, Thommy Hutson (January 21, 2014) [May 4, 2010]. Never Sleep Again: The Elm Street Legacy (Blu-ray). Amazon.com. 1428 Films.)) deceased)
- Significant others: Daniel Jordan (boyfriend; deceased)
- Children: Jacob Daniel Johnson (son)
- Origin: Springwood, Ohio
- Character type: Final girl
- Status: Alive (Note: Deceased in Freddy vs. Jason vs. Ash: The Nightmare Warriors, which is not considered to be canonical.)

Alice Johnson is a fictional character and a final girl in the A Nightmare on Elm Street franchise. She first appears in A Nightmare on Elm Street 4: The Dream Master (1988) as a teenager that inherits dream superpowers from the victims of enigmatic, supernatural serial killer Freddy Krueger. In this film, she was portrayed by Lisa Wilcox—who reprises the role in A Nightmare on Elm Street 5: The Dream Child (1989). Alice is widely regarded as one of Freddy's two arch-nemeses, alongside Nancy Thompson, and also for being the only protagonist to face Freddy twice and live.

Writers William Kotzwinkle and Brian Helgeland conceptualized Alice. Alice is notable for her developed character arc, which features her evolving from an introverted girl to a proactive heroine. This emphasis on developing her character has led to Alice receiving a positive reception. Being an archenemy of Freddy, Alice is a primary protagonist. Alice returns in the novelizations and the canon comic book continuations.

== Appearances ==
=== Film ===
In A Nightmare on Elm Street 4: The Dream Master, Alice Johnson was the best friend of Kristen Parker. Their friendship was further solidified due to Alice's brother Rick dating Kristen. Alice and Rick came from a broken family. Their mother had long died before the events of the film, and the grief and devastation likely turned their father Dennis into an alcoholic. Whereas Rick showed gregariousness to mask his emotional pain, Alice became timid and withdrawn—to the point that she covered her dresser mirror with pictures just so she would not have to see her reflection. She worked as a waitress and daydreamed constantly to escape from the real world. When Kristen is provoked by Freddy Krueger and desperately pulls Alice into her dream for help, Kristen passes on her dream powers before being killed by Freddy.

Alice became the "Dream Master", described in the script as a mythical "ancient guardian of the gate of good dreams", (Note: Final script (William Kotzwinkle & Brian Helgeland and Jim Wheat & Ken Wheat (May 9, 1988). "A NIGHTMARE ON ELM STREET 4: THE DREAM MASTER" (pdf) – via Nightmare on Elm Street Companion.)) due to the combination of Kristen's powers and her own latent dreaming abilities (e.g., shortly before Freddy's final attack on Kristen, Alice appears in Kristen's dream as a child playing on a beach). Alice then became Freddy's next target because, by killing Kristen, he could no longer access new victims. Alice, being extremely inexperienced with her dream-powers, was Freddy's loophole, as he could kill anyone that she uncontrollably pulled into her dreams. Her link to Freddy allowed her to take on the abilities — both from the waking world and the dream world — of his victims. As Alice's friends and brother are picked off by Freddy, she grows much stronger and capable of fighting back through the abilities that she accumulates. Sensing that Freddy relied on his victim's souls, Alice manages to defeat him by giving all of his victims the power to escape Freddy's body and enter the positive dream gate.

In A Nightmare on Elm Street 5: The Dream Child, Alice suppressed her encounter with Freddy by starting a relationship with Dan Jordan (the other survivor from The Dream Master) and making new friends. However, after becoming pregnant by Dan, Alice begins having nightmares about Freddy that reflect the horror surrounding his conception and birth. Alice's friends and Dan are soon murdered, and it is revealed that Freddy is planning to be reborn in the body of her unborn son Jacob Daniel Johnson. He is corrupting Jacob by feeding him the souls of the victims. Due to her pregnancy, Alice shares her "Dream Master" abilities with Jacob. There is a caveat, however, as Jacob is able to blur the boundary between the waking world and the dream world without Alice needing to be asleep. Thereby, just like his mother in the previous film, Jacob becomes a prime target for manipulation due to not having the right control over his abilities. When Alice is on the verge of losing her battle against Freddy, Sister Mary Helena (Amanda Krueger) urges Jacob to beat Freddy with the souls that were fed to him. Upon Freddy's demise, Alice gives birth to Jacob several months later. They move out of Springwood sometime in between the events of The Dream Child and Freddy's Dead: The Final Nightmare.

=== Literature ===
Alice in Nightmares on Elm Street (1991) and Freddy vs. Jason vs. Ash: The Nightmare Warriors (2009)

Alice is one of the main protagonists of Innovation Publishing's 1991 Nightmares on Elm Street comics. In this comic book series, Alice returns to Springwood following the death of her father and is forced to face Freddy after he again tries to use Jacob to kill for him. In the end, Neil Gordon gives up his body so that he can join Nancy Thompson in the "Beautiful Dream." Dan's spirit occupies Neil's body, and he is reunited with Alice and Jacob. (Note: Nightmares on Elm Street #3-6 (Innovation Publishing, 1991): Andy Mangels (w), Patrick Rolo (p), Ray Kryssing (i). "Loose Ends Pt. 1: Return To Springwood" Nightmares on Elm Street, vol. 1, no. 3 (1991). Innovation Publishing.; Andy Mangels (w), Patrick Rolo (p), Ray Kryssing (i). "Loose Ends Part 2: Dead Men Telling Tales" Nightmares on Elm Street, vol. 1, no. 4 (1991). Innovation Publishing.; Andy Mengels (w), Patrick Rolo (p), Ray Kryssing (i). "Bang Bang: Devonne's Silver Hammer" Nightmares on Elm Street, vol. 1, no. 5 (1991). Innovation Publishing.; Andy Mangels (w), Patrick Rolo (p), Ray Kryssing (i). "If I Should Die Before My Wake" Nightmares on Elm Street, vol. 1, no. 6 (1991). Innovation Publishing.)

She also appears in Freddy vs. Jason vs. Ash: Nightmare Warriors where a vision of Freddy causes her to meet with other Freddy and Jason survivors. As with The Dream Child, Alice and Jacob are partly linked regarding the "Dream Master" abilities. For instance, a sleeping Jacob has the ability to call an awake Alice. In turn, Alice can physically enter Jacob's dream and wake up in the place that he fell asleep. Alice's dream powers come at a cost, as she has been suffering from a terminal illness. She later sacrifices herself to pass her full powers onto Jacob. (Note: Jeff Katz and James Kuhoric (w), Jason Craig (p). Freddy vs. Jason vs. Ash: The Nightmare Warriors, no. 1-6 (2009). WildStorm.)

In the anthology book The Nightmares on Elm Street: Freddy Krueger's Seven Sweetest Dreams (1991), Alice appears in Philip Nutman's short story "Dead Highway, Lost Roads". Years after the events of Dream Child, Alice is now married to a real estate developer named Steve Segel. Although they've settled into a normal domestic routine, there's still cracks in their marriage — Alice is secretive about her Dream Master abilities and Steve feels like he's competing with his wife's late high school sweetheart Dan Jordan. Alice cannot shake her frightful encounters with Freddy, and she even insists (much to Steve's chagrin) on living near a shopping mall complex that has been built over 1428 Elm Street to secretly keep watch. While driving to visit her father Dennis at a rehabilitation clinic, Alice is involved in a major car pileup. Freddy manipulates the lucid dream abilities of serial killer Karl Stolenberg (who was involved in the accident while en route to his execution) in order to ensnare Alice in the "dead highway". Alice searches for a means of escape while Freddy prepares an "Alice in Wonderland" tableau in anticipation of their reunion. Six-year-old Jacob—who is staying in Wisconsin with Yvonne—enters the dreamworld upon sensing Alice's peril, and enlists the aid of Karl and anthropomorphic armadillo Joe Bob to find his mother. Near the conclusion, a deranged Karl attacks Alice, but is returned to his senses by Jacob through physical force. Alice and Karl cooperate to defeat Freddy, though Karl perishes in the battle. With Freddy defeated, Alice and Jacob return to the waking world.

Alice is also mentioned in the short story "Le Morte De Freddy" by William Relling Jr. In between the events of The Dream Master and The Dream Child, Alice sent a letter to Dr. Neil Gordon (now living in Gainesville, Florida) that Kristen Parker, Roland Kincaid and Joey Crusel were murdered by Freddy, but that she took care of him. With Freddy now terrorizing a new batch of adolescent psychiatric patients, Dr. Gordon teams up with another psychiatrist to stop Freddy for good. Alice, whose whereabouts are unspecified, is not involved in their plan. She is mentioned by Freddy, along with Nancy and Kristen, when he accuses them of hating their neglectful parents, claiming that it was their hate and not their fear that allowed him to get into their dreams.

Her son Jacob is the main protagonist in Natasha Rhodes' novel A Nightmare on Elm Street: Perchance to Dream. The book mentions that his grandmother Doris Jordan stole custody from Alice when Jacob was born, though he eventually entered the foster system. Alice went missing shortly after an adolescent Jacob was institutionalized at Westin Hills for killing his foster parents (who he was hallucinating as being Freddy). It is revealed that anyone who is aware of Freddy's existence is quarantined in the institution. Upon escaping from the mental hospital, Jacob sees a vision of her when he passes by his childhood home. Near the end, he sees another vision of his mother suffering unresponsively in the dream world, supposedly killed by Freddy; it is not clarified in the novel whether Jacob's vision of Alice is truly her or just an apparition conjured up by Freddy to torment him. Even though Alice is absent, Jacob has stopped himself and others from dreaming for a month by using his dream powers to protect everyone from Freddy.

=== In fan films ===
Although not considered a part of the official film canon, Alice (played by Taylor Burskey) has a cameo in Don't Fall Asleep: The Film (2016). Taking place in between A Nightmare on Elm Street and A Nightmare on Elm Street 3: Dream Warriors, Nancy Thompson (played by Diandra Lazor) is struggling to maintain her sanity after she is checked into a psychiatric ward. In the film, Alice's mother is an exhausted nurse that works at the ward.

== Reception ==
Monika Bartyzel stated that Alice is different when compared to other final girls and that her empowerment over the course of the films became an essential plot point, she said:

“At first, she's the shy, introverted hanger-on to her much more wild friends (much like Laurie Strode). She considers herself a non-entity, preferring to mask her mirror, and thereby herself, with her friends' images. When they die, however, and she mystically consumes portions of their strength, the pictures come down in chunks as she wipes away the old Alice to become the active fighter. Instead of teamwork, the team is infused into one previously passive being, a mecha-human designed to defeat the dream monster. Alice is one of the few true and ongoing Final Girls; she survives two films, saves her child from demonic possession, and disappears from the Nightmare on Elm Street world without ever succumbing to the inevitability of death in a future installment.”

Other A Nightmare on Elm Street fans have also highlighted Alice's "inner journey" as the primary aspect that makes her stand out among horror protagonists, with Patti Pauley writing that "Alice Johnson's journey towards her end-game battle with Freddy is unique among her '80s horror movie peers" and (in contrast with Nancy Thompson) "Nancy from the get-go was clearly a strong-minded individual, whereas Alice had to go through some rough shit to get herself there". On the horror blog Horror and Sons, Cody Mascho similarly comments that "One of the biggest reasons I love Alice is how she's built up over both movies. She undergoes an amazing and relatable character journey, which really allows the viewer to root for and sympathize with her". Joshua Anderson has written that Alice's character arc of evolving from shy and introverted to headstrong and extroverted helped him with coming to terms with his own homosexuality while growing up.

Alice removing the photos from her mirror to finally see her reflection fully and gearing up for final battle against Freddy has been called a "coming-of-age moment" for her, with Bryan at Horror Report arguing that

“as that epic 1980s music plays, she slowly reveals her own face to herself. And with each picture removed, we see someone different emerging. Someone who looks ferocious in nature. Someone who is ready for battle against evil. [...] ...looking back, these two scenes seem almost visceral. They’re epic moments, but they’re also necessary moments in Alice’s coming of age. And in a way, what makes them some of the best scenes in the entire movie is that Alice is finally ready for the fight. She’s able to remember and honor her past while becoming something new, something strong enough to take on a future in which she has to put parts of that past behind her.”

Brennan Klein on Dread Central calls Alice's character arc "the most powerful in the franchise", adding that "in between the cockroach weight lifting and the time loops and the movie theater vortex is a genuinely powerful story of a young woman's self-actualization in the face of trauma". The website Lady Geek Girl and Friends praised the intelligence and strength of the character saying, "Letting go of the past, suiting up for battle with the accoutrements of her fallen friends, and finally looking at herself in the mirror and being damn pleased with what she sees, ugh, it's one of the best sequences in the series. In the ensuing battle we see just how powerful Alice really is as she is the first heroine in the series to face Freddy in the dream, alone, and triumph. The fight takes her to the limits of what she can do, and everything she's gained from her friends helps, but in the end it's her own intelligence that defeats the monster." Similarly, Tommy Watanabe praised the strength of the character, saying:

“In the fifth installment of the franchise, Alice fights to protect her unborn child from the possession of Freddy's spirit using more of her abilities, even invading the nightmare of her new bestie (wow, Alice, you move on quick) Yvonne by spearing Freddy with a pipe as he tries to kill Yvonne. Capable and creative, Alice proves to be a strong woman readily available to protect her friends (or attempt to, in the case of comic book artist Mark and aspiring model Greta) and family at any cost. More importantly, she had sex... and survived!”

Alice was ranked 12th on BuzzFeed's top 25 list of final girls, the 7th on ComingSoon.net 11th on Paste Magazine's list "The 20 Best "Final Girls" in Horror Movie History" and one of "8 Badass Female Characters in Horror Films".

Dustin Pinney on Looper argues that Alice is "the closest this series gets to an action hero in the vein of Ripley from "Aliens" or Sarah Connor in "Terminator 2", and that she "actually makes it through to the end. She's able to do this because she's smart, resourceful, and no longer afraid of herself or anyone else. She's a truly inspiring character. She teaches us that dreams are all well and good, but taking control of your life is what matters." Others have noted parallels with Ellen Ripley, comparing her line "Get away from him, you son of a bitch!" when saving Dan (who's helpless due to having a surgery) with Ripley's iconic line "Get away from her, you bitch!" in Aliens (1986) and compares Alice's personal growth with that of Ripley. The Halloweenies podcast calls her character arc the strongest one of the protagonists of the franchise, and is referred to as the Tommy Jarvis - from the Friday the 13th series - in terms of her prominence as a survivor of her franchise. Alice's relationship with her alcoholic father in The Dream Master is however noted to be a less fleshed out copy of Nancy Thompson's relationship with her alcoholic mother Marge in the original 1984 installment.

On Cinapse, Ashlee Blackwell writes that "far from your mass-produced horror maiden serving only one purpose, Alice is multi-dimensional" and that she is "representative of a woman as 'human, normal' and whole in what has been said to be the most sexist of film genres next to pornography. Alice was not simply the shy girl who never gets the guy; the buxom, sexually promiscuous fatale, or even just the capable 'final girl' who defeats the killer. She is a naturally progressing variation of many of those traits and more, wrapped in one character in one film."

Brooke Bundy, who played Elaine Parker in The Dream Master, claimed to have been "blown away" by Lisa Wilcox and of Alice's character arc, comparing her to Wonder Woman "before the other Wonder Woman came along".

On HorrorFam.com, Christy Bandy names Alice as her favorite final girl, stating that in the scene of Alice preparing for the final fight against Freddy in front of her mirror, "Alice sees herself as she never could but has always been: brave and uncompromising" and "this newfound confidence isn’t due to a makeover, a haircut, or anything superficial – it’s Alice embracing her own raw power, connecting to herself in a way she hadn’t before, and accessing her own abilities, elevated by her friends’ powers. It’s harnessing female strength in such a powerful and visceral way that she surprises even herself with what she can do". Bandy also calls The Dream Master "a young woman’s journey to self-acceptance as well as a coming-of-age movie with lots of deep parallels to self-discovery".

In the short-lived horror magazine Toxic Horror, writer David Henry Jacobs questions the logic of Alice wanting to keep her baby:

“The big question: could a mother ever know a moment's peace raising a child whose mind has been subjected to Freddy's tampering? Irresistible programming might be buried in Jacob's sub-conscious, silently ticking away, waiting for the stimulus that will trigger Freddy's post-hypnotically induced vengeance in the future. Does Alice dare give birth to such a child, for fear of loosing a new kind of horror on the world?”

He also wrote that "but Alice wants to have her and Dan's baby. If she doesn't no movie. Plus, mother love is good box office". He compares her aborting her baby to the producers of Aliens (1986) potentially letting the xenomorphs kill Newt and Hicks as well. Jacobs also compares Alice to Ripley at several occasions, especially in her pursuit of Freddy across a succession of dream-planes in the climax. (Note: Jacobs, David Henry (February 1990). "Freddy: The Undead vs The Unborn". Toxic Horror. Vol. 1, no. 2. 475 Park Avenue South, New York, NY 10016: Starlog Telecommunications Inc. p. 46-57.)

== Development ==
=== Conception ===
==== A Nightmare on Elm Street 4: The Dream Master ====
In The Dream Master scripts written by William Kotzwinkle, Brian Helgeland, Jim Wheat, and Ken Wheat, Alice still begins as a shy and introverted individual. A marked difference is that Kristen and Alice have a closer friendship. In the script, before learning about the deaths of Kincaid and Joey, Kristen confides in Alice that she has the ability to pull others into her dreams. When the group explores 1428 Elm Street, a still mystified Alice foreshadows her bravery by volunteering to be pulled into Kristen's dream if the need should arise. Alice asserts herself earlier in the film, describing the supernatural circumstances surrounding Kristen's death to the group. She tells her brother Rick about her newfound abilities, and he plays an active role in trying to keep her awake until he himself is killed. While Alice still has a final showdown with Freddy, she undergoes a physical transformation during the dresser mirror scene in which her body becomes leaner, muscular and adorned with supernatural accouterments. In the script, it is elaborated that "She's quite beautiful now, and there's a surety and strength in her eyes" (after Rick's death), and at the end scene: "Alice is far from what she looked like in the film's beginning. She radiates an earthy sensuousness and an inner strength." According to Andras Jones who played Alice's brother Rick, the two were twins in at least one draft of the script, explaining the two attending the same class in high school. Due to a writer's strike going on in 1988, Andras and Lisa wrote their own dialogue for the scene where they watched past home videos of themselves with Kristen and other friends while discussing Kristen's death. A deleted scene was filmed for The Dream Master in which Alice has a nightmare about her father supposedly being murdered by Freddy in their kitchen; some footage of Lisa Wilcox reacting to the scene can be seen in the documentary "The Making of A Nightmare on Elm Street 4".

==== A Nightmare on Elm Street 5: The Dream Child ====
"I thought she needed to have that child, plus — yes, [it's] bad for the box office [...] Probably because half the nation’s anti-abortion. It’s not that I’m anti-abortion; I just wanted her to have the baby. So I didn’t give her much choice myself, but I wanted to make it clear that it was her choice."

— Producer Sara Risher on her role in deciding Alice's storyline in The Dream Child

For the sequel to The Dream Master, the producer's brief to the scriptwriters was "Alice is pregnant, Freddy wants the baby, Dan is the first to die". Robert Englund explains that "Freddy's ultimate goal is to be reborn into the world as Alice's baby". Producer Sara Risher had been instrumental in pursuing the pregnancy storyline for the fourth sequel – after originally rejecting Leslie Bohem's pregnancy pitch for what became A Nightmare on Elm Street 2: Freddy's Revenge in 1985 – personally rooting for Alice to ultimately keep her baby in spite of the severe hardships she suffers throughout the film; Risher explains that she wanted to present the decision as Alice's personal choice rather than assuming an outspoken anti-abortionist stance in the film. Risher also feared that Americans with anti-abortionist convictions might be offended if she were to choose abortion. Lisa Wilcox felt that the gravity of teen pregnancy was absent from the earlier drafts, saying that

"the first few versions of the script completely ignored things like abortion and adoption, things that teenagers have to contemplate. Fortunately, the writers and producers realized that even though this is a horror film and a fantasy, teen pregnancy is an important issue that must be dealt with in a realistic manner. They added certain elements to the Alice character to explore the situation".

With regard to The Dream Child scripts, Alice still battles Freddy to save her unborn son. Depending upon the script, Alice goes from an active to a passive protagonist as the events unfold. The best example is in the first script draft. Upon Freddy's resurrection, a cornered Alice is ready to die before pulling in more victims for him to kill. Freddy makes his plans known quickly, as he is the one that informs Alice that she is pregnant. Dan also learns that Alice is pregnant, unlike the film where Freddy kills him before the revelation. Alice has made new friends, and her past encounters with Freddy are no secret to them. Her straightforward efforts to prepare them for Freddy's onslaught fall short, however. With each murder, Alice still absorbs the souls through her womb but the script specifies that her gestation period is hastened. Alice accumulates her knowledge through help from Jacob (named Jason in the script) who introduces her to a book about dreams. By studying the book, Alice learns how to enter Freddy's mind through the "dream pool" and communicate with Sister Mary Helena (Amanda Krueger). As Freddy advances on Alice, her sonogram shows twins as Freddy's evil fetus is depleting Jacob in a parasitic symbiosis. Due to a warped pregnancy making her physically incapacitated, Alice is unable to fight back against Freddy's machinations. By the script's conclusion, the parasitic Freddy baby leaves Alice's body because of Sister Mary Helena's interference and Jacob is delivered instead.

As opposed to the film, the first draft of The Dream Child shows a greater rapport between Jacob and Alice as they research on how to defeat Freddy. Their relationship is further illustrated by Alice and Jacob experiencing the same physical deterioration as the plot unfolds. Yet, Alice does not know the true identity of Jacob until after she gives birth to him. So, in essence, the original plot detail differs from the film in that it impacts Alice's maternal motivation to save Jacob. In David Schow's treatment, Alice gives birth to twins.

==== Other scripts ====
In the original script for Freddy's Dead: The Final Nightmare (1991), Alice was set to return. She would have been killed by Freddy early in the film, making Jacob the main protagonist. However, this version of the script was scrapped and the actual film makes no mention of Alice or Jacob, and leaves their fates ambiguous. Lisa Wilcox has since confirmed that the producers never made any attempt to call her back for the sixth Elm Street film, although they did contact her about allowing footage of Alice to appear during the end credits. Footage of Alice also appears in flashbacks during Freddy's introduction in Freddy vs. Jason (2003).

In another alternate script for what became Freddy's Dead: The Final Nightmare, submitted by Steven Lebowitz, Freddy returns very shortly after the events of The Dream Child and kills Jacob — still a baby — by bouncing him of the ceiling in a similar manner to how Tina Gray died; Alice ends up choosing to commit suicide rather than waiting for the inevitable of Freddy getting the enjoyment of killing her next. One of the numerous alternate screenplays for Freddy vs Jason written by later Hellboy movie co-writer Peter Briggs in 1995 would have seen Alice teaming up with Friday the 13th protagonists Steven Freeman and Jessica Kimble from Jason Goes to Hell: The Final Friday in 1999, leading to their respective children Jacob and Stephanie being kidnapped by Jason Voorhees, whose mind Alice enters to discover that he was an Elm Street child and that his mother Pamela was one of the vigilante parents who burned the human Fred Krueger to death. She would also have dropped a hydraulically raised Pontiac car over the pursuing Jason in a garage. Freddy would have chased Alice and Jessica Kimble through Hell, only to be distracted by Thanos, Lord of the Underworld, allowing Alice and Jessica to escape with Jacob and Stephanie and survive.

Briggs called Alice "obviously an extremely useful character on multiple levels" to his storytelling. The concept of survivors of the two franchises coalescing, along with the ending with a time-displaced character signing the botched search warrant for Freddy back in the 60's, would later be used as an inspiration for the aforementioned Freddy vs. Jason vs. Ash: The Nightmare Warriors comic book series according to former New Line Cinema executive Jeff Katz, who cites the Peter Briggs draft as his favorite.

=== Characterization ===
"In the end, Alice is able to control her dreams. Not only her dreams, but she's able to control her life, and that's what the film is about: how she grows from being a shy girl to a grown woman. It's about taking responsibility and facing your fears, which is a theme I think is close to every teenager."

— Renny Harlin (1988)

The script of The Dream Master introduces Alice with the description

"In a definite contrast to Kristen's easy beauty, Alice is not especially well put together. And yet there's something about this shy-looking girl that suggests that she might be incredibly attractive if she had any confidence."

In an interview Lisa Wilcox described Alice as an outcast that a lot of people can relate to, she said:

"I immediately fell in love with the story of Alice, she's a daydreamer who was kind of pathetic at the beginning of Part Four, and I think we all can relate to that feeling in some ways. Actually, I was totally a wallflower in high school so there was a lot of myself in the character of Alice. There's a lot of Lisa on that screen."

Wilcox also mentioned the character development of Alice by stating that:

"As an actress, though, what made Alice remarkable is that audiences watch Alice become stronger and stronger as the movie plays along, and you can't help but be a part of her journey because she's so relatable."

Alice has reddish hair in The Dream Master, but has Lisa Wilcox's natural blond hair in the sequel. According to Wilcox, the producers wanted to differentiate Alice to Kristen since Tuesday Knight also had naturally light blond hair, as did Brooke Theiss (Debbie Stevens). Wilcox did not want to dye her hair with more permanent chemicals, but agreed to rinse it daily for the shootings. For Dream Child, the producers did not deem it necessary for Wilcox to color her hair again.

In The Dream Master, Alice is portrayed as a regular daydreamer who wishes she would have the courage to ask her crush out, handsome jock Dan Jordan, and stand up to her alcoholic single father when he lashes out at her. Similar to fellow heroine Nancy Thompson's father Donald, Alice's father is an "alcoholic who is a parental failure" in Dream Master, and Alice thus resorts to "daydreaming as an escapist vehicle from a dysfunctional family". She describes her worst fear as being to have to work as a lowly waitress for the rest of her life, embodying "adolescent fears of entrapment in low-income service employment, a grim reality for most middle-class teenagers", and one that Freddy forces her to confront in her cinematic dream. A student refers to Alice as a "basket case" to Dan, who angrily rebukes him. She is portrayed as very shy and withdrawn at first, and her more outgoing brother Rick tries to cheer her up and teach her to stand up for herself. In the film, Alice's personal development is shown metaphorically through the mirror in her room, which at first she has loaded with photographs that she gradually removes for each one of her murdered friends.

In his book Horror Films of the 1980s, John Kenneth Muir noted the following:

"Alice's blossoming is coupled with the mirror (an important symbol in the film). When she is weak and diffident, the mirror is loaded with photographs that obscure her reflection. The message is that she doesn't want to see herself; she'd rather hide from what she considers ugly. But as Alice's strength grows, she takes down the photos and countenances her own image. What she finds there is gorgeous and strong."

Muir believes that Alice's transformation "is the perfect counterpoint to Freddy's storyline." Whereas Freddy's reflection encompasses evil, Alice's "reflection is what makes her powerful." According to Muir, the character of Alice Johnson, goes against the "final girl" stereotype in that she is a "greasy-haired ugly duckling [who finds] her inner strength and beauty through self-actualization" adding that "from Nancy to Alice, the women on Elm Street are tough, resourceful, powerful role models for teenagers, ones who--mirror--reality in their efforts to navigate high school, and indeed life."

In her essay Final Girls and Terrible Youth: Transgression in 1980s Slasher Horror, Sarah Trencansky praises the final girls of the ANOES franchise as being "worlds away from the stereotypical victimized females of horror" and calls Alice the most powerful of them, and that "she is an assemblage of strengths: a fighter like her brother, intelligent like her friend Sheila, strong like her weight-lifting friend Deb. Alice's ability to absorb the characteristics of those whom Freddy kills has also been likened to the video game robotic character Mega Man.

In the book Generation Multiplex: The Image of Youth in American Cinema after 1980, Timothy Shary describes the metaphorical quality of the storyline in part 5 and of Alice's "pro-life" choice, arguing that Alice's cargo as a young, now single mother might potentially have been a worse nightmare to many other teenage girls/young women than anything Freddy might have come up with:

"Alice, who's been impregnated by her slain boyfriend, realizes that Freddy plans to pose as a fetus growing inside her, but rather than abort the baby, thereby killing the possibility of spawning another monster, she adamantly declares her choice to keep it. In a less fanciful film this could be read as an ironic pro-life stance, but here Alice uses her capacity to give birth as her maternal defense against Freddy's patriarchal power. In a convoluted showdown, Alice violently pulls the diseased Freddy fetus out of her body, an image of monstrous birth and abortion, and this mutant then enters Freddy's mother, where he is finally re-contained in her womb. Alice retains her original "good" baby, and thus the result of her having sex is both death and life; the film's irony is that this teenager is faced with the challenge of raising a child alone, perhaps a more realistic nightmare for teen girls than any offered by Freddy."

On the subject, John Kenneth Muir adds that "the idea of abortion, the hottest of all hot button issues, is handled in a very casual, non-preachy fashion", summarizing that "[Alice is] afraid of what her child will be; she wants to protect it; and she has to fend off Dan's parents, who want to adopt the child... [she must deal] with all of these competing emotions and stresses, not to mention Freddy...."

John Carl Buechler, director of Friday the 13th Part VII: The New Blood (1988) and who was also involved in the Dream Master creative team the very same year, has compared the character arc of Friday the 13th heroine Tina Shepard from said film with Alice's arc, pointing out that "both films are about heroines who take on special powers which they use to fight the monster. In The New Blood, Tina's able to fully harness her telekinetic powers by the end to defeat Jason which is what happened, more or less, in The Dream Master."

Jude Deluca on Wicked Horror argues that Alice Johnson is the closest thing the slasher genre has to the magical girl trope, writing that "all magical girls are granted a special sequence where they transform into their magical identities, accompanied by badass music", which corresponds with Alice's scene of gearing up for battle to the sound of an instrumental version of Go West's "Don't Be Afraid of Your Dreams" (commonly known as "Alice Gets Ready" by fans), that as the Dream Master she also corresponds to the chosen one trope, and that many magical girls undergo a similar character arc of going from shy and timid to a strong and capable person, described as "ordinary girls gain magic power, and use it to achieve their dreams and seek out the boys they love under a more confident persona". Deluca compares Alice to characters like Nemurin in Magical Girl Raising Project, Rem Ayanokōji in Dream Hunter Rem and Sailor Moon.

It can be argued that Alice Johnson breaks two common patterns of the typical final girl: that of being virginal and sexually inactive in comparison with other characters - as she not only had sex as an unwed teenager but even became pregnant and eventually a single mother at the end of The Dream Child - and the other pattern being that she survived her encounter with the killer a second time, a feat only a few final girls like Laurie Strode and Sidney Prescott has achieved.

== See also ==
- Final girl
- Jacob Daniel Johnson
- Nancy Thompson
