= Nancy Thompson (A Nightmare on Elm Street) =

Main character in the A Nightmare on Elm Street series

- A Nightmare on Elm Street character
- Heather Langenkamp as Nancy Thompson in the film A Nightmare on Elm Street (1984).
- First appearance: A Nightmare on Elm Street (1984)
- Last appearance: A Nightmare on Elm Street (2010)
- Created by: Wes Craven
- Portrayed by: Heather Langenkamp; Rooney Mara

In-universe information
- Full name: Nancy Thompson (original continuity); Nancy Holbrook (remake)
- Occupation: Psychology student (original continuity); Waitress (remake)
- Status: Deceased (original continuity); Alive (remake)

Nancy Thompson is a fictional character in the A Nightmare on Elm Street franchise. She first appears in A Nightmare on Elm Street (1984) as a teenager hunted in her dreams by enigmatic serial killer Freddy Krueger. In this film, she was portrayed by Heather Langenkamp—who reprises the role in the sequel, A Nightmare on Elm Street 3: Dream Warriors (1987). Langenkamp later portrayed a fictional version of herself who embodies the role of Nancy in Wes Craven's New Nightmare (1994). A reimagined version of the character is portrayed by Rooney Mara in the 2010 remake.

Wes Craven conceptualized Nancy after a conversation with his daughter, Jessica. She questioned him over his clumsy-depiction of the heroine in Swamp Thing (1982)—particularly over the scene in which the heroine stereotypically trips and falls over nothing. He wanted Nancy to be a start to depicting a positive portrayal of women in his films. Being Freddy's archenemy, Nancy is the protagonist in the original film, and serves as a supporting character guide for other characters in the third film. The character also appears in spin-off works of the series such as the various novelizations and the canon comic book continuation Nightmares on Elm Street (Innovation Publishing) amongst supporting roles in other comics by different publishers.

Nancy has been called a significant figure in the horror genre and American pop culture, with depictions in various video games, toy lines, and fan art, and is considered "one of the most progressive female representations in the teen horror genre." She is one of the original examples of the "final girl" theory by Carol J. Clover in her 1992 non-fiction book Men, Women, and Chain Saws. However, Clover's inclusion of the character in this trope has been agreed upon and challenged due to Nancy's characterization.

== Concept and creation ==
=== Development ===
The origins of Nancy began with a conversation that Wes Craven had with his daughter Jessica, which led to him reevaluating his 1982 film Swamp Thing and the way he had portrayed women up until that point. There is a scene in which the heroine Alice Cable (Adrienne Barbeau) is running, and she trips and falls. Upon watching, his daughter remarked, "You know, just because I'm a girl doesn't mean I'm clumsy. You don't have to have them falling down." He attests that this was a common trope in filmmaking and that he wanted Nancy to be a start of young heroines eliminating this concept.

Nancy was a highly sought-after role, with many of the actresses having to sit on the floor due to there not being enough chairs. In the winter of 1983, newcomer actress Heather Langenkamp became aware of auditions. Her reading impressed casting director Annette Benson and Craven enough that she received a call back to read with another actress auditioning, Amanda Wyss. During this audition, she improvised a clawing motion with her fingers and a screeching sound. Her natural approach to the character ultimately caught Craven's attention, and she got hired for the part. He wrote Nancy as a "legitimate all-American, girl-next-door" and felt that Langenkamp embodied these qualities.

Craven approached Langenkamp in 1986 to ask if he could include her Nancy character in the A Nightmare on Elm Street 3: Dream Warriors script that he was writing. In Craven's script, Nancy was closer to her personality in the first film. While the characteristics of the character change significantly in the final product, her death at the end remains the same. Some significant scenes involving Nancy in Dream Warriors were either cut from the film or never filmed; Langenkamp and co-star Craig Wasson both refer to a scene they filmed in which they kissed, with Wasson stating that "No, we didn't have sex, but there was this one real hot kiss that just about melted the camera lens. Too bad they cut it." Another significant scene that does not feature Nancy but mentions her is the cut penultimate scene (before the final scene with the model house lighting up while Neil sleeps) in the shooting script between survivors Kristen Parker and Neil Gordon in which Neil hint that she's visiting him in his dreams post-mortem, similarly to Freddy but benevolent; this was carried over from the original script but was not ultimately included in the film.

With regard to A Nightmare on Elm Street 3: Dream Warriors, Heather Langenkamp stated her viewpoints about Nancy Thompson's characterization:

"The connection with Nancy was there. I never felt that comfortable in the skin of that role because...I just felt like the dialogue that they gave Nancy was so stiff and there was no sense of humour at all. She had barely anything going in that department at all and then she's supposed to be having this quasi-love affair with Craig Wasson's character... None of it really seemed to have a dynamic energy behind it and as a result I felt I didn't know what Nancy was anymore. I was struggling to make something of her because she didn't have that big of a role in some way. She was like a facilitator, she was always showing things like 'let me show you how to do this', 'let's do it together' but she was never really moving the plot forward herself that much and as a result I didn't feel like I did a very good job in that role. Then when I saw the movie I thought 'oh it's not as bad as I thought' because actually the relationship I had with the kids does come through and she is a kind of a reassuring presence in the movie rather than this fighting, battle warrior that she was in the first movie. So I just had to get used to this different role that Nancy played..."

Rooney Mara was confirmed to portray a reimagined Nancy in 2010; Mara signed on for a sequel if it were to ever be made. Director Samuel Bayer describes this version of the character as "the loneliest girl in the world". Mara stated her portrayal is different than the original, performed by Langenkamp, and refers to her as "socially awkward and timid and really doesn't know how to connect with people". She stated to Vogue that she disliked the experience of portraying the character so much, that she contemplated quitting acting.

=== Costume design ===
Nancy's appearance is recognizable for her gray streak in her hair and her emblematic pajamas. The character's hair was supposed to be entirely gray and white, and Wes Craven had a wig made but was ultimately unsatisfied; deciding for Nancy to have a streak of gray—which would remain in both Dream Warriors and New Nightmare. For the 1984 film, costume designer Dana Lyman conceptualized Nancy's white pajamas that the character wore during her encounters with Freddy. Lyman described the outfit as "her armor as she went into battle." The details of her white top include blue trim and a pattern of roses. Jolene Richardson of Fangoria interprets these details as combining masculine and feminine traits of Nancy.

== Appearances ==
=== Films ===
The character made her cinematic debut in A Nightmare on Elm Street on November 9, 1984. In this film, Nancy (Heather Langenkamp) is a middle-class teenage girl with divorced parents and is dating a boy named Glenn Lantz, who lives across the street from her. Nancy and her friends begin having the same realistic nightmares of a severely burnt man with a bladed glove trying to kill them. After her friend, Tina Gray has nightmares and her mother leaves town, Nancy and Glenn decide to have a sleepover in order to comfort her. After Tina is killed that very night, Nancy takes active steps to trace down the cause of the phenomena and finds the enigmatic figure in her dreams to be the vengeful ghost Freddy Krueger (Robert Englund), a child killer that was burned alive by local parents when she was a child. The lone survivor, Nancy realizes she can pull things out of the nightmare and devises a plan to pull him into the real world, where he is vulnerable. After Glenn is killed by Freddy, Nancy booby traps her house and manages to pull Freddy from the dream world and into the real world, causing him to run into the traps. However, Nancy's mother is killed by Krueger in the final confrontation and Nancy realizes her fear gives him his power, so she turns her back on him, defeating him as he disappears Nancy walks outside to find her mother and friends still alive. As she gets into the car with her friends to go to school, the car begins to lock them in and speeds off, just as Krueger reaches through the small window of the door and pulls Nancy's mother through it, revealing that it's a dream and that Freddy is still active in the dream world.

Although Nancy does not appear in A Nightmare on Elm Street 2: Freddy's Revenge, she maintains a presence through her diary when a new family moves into the house where she battled Freddy. Teenager Jesse Walsh (Mark Patton), who inhabits Nancy's old room and his girlfriend Lisa (Kim Myers) discover Nancy's old diary, which chronicles the events of the first film.

In A Nightmare on Elm Street 3: Dream Warriors (1987), Nancy is a young adult enrolled in graduate school studying psychology and is hired as a student intern at Westin Hills Mental Institution due to her groundbreaking research on pattern nightmares (nightmare disorder). Nancy realizes the teenagers inhabiting the hospital are the surviving children of the parents who killed Freddy when one of the patients, Kristen Parker (Patricia Arquette), pulls her into one of her nightmares. Nancy explains to them their pasts and begins to train them on how to use their "dream powers," superpowers that are unique to them in their dreams. In a last attempt effort to save one of the patients from Freddy, Nancy does a group hypnosis with them, and together they navigate the nightmare world. The film ends with Nancy dying after being stabbed by Krueger, but manages to stab him with his own glove, while Neil takes care of Freddy's corpse and douses it in holy water to fully destroy him. She is laid to rest in the cemetery, with Kristen, Joey, Kincaid and Neil in attendance.

Wes Craven's New Nightmare (1994) takes a meta approach to the character. The film is set in the "real world," following a fictionalized version of Heather Langenkamp contemplating Wes Craven's offer of her reprising her role of Nancy in another A Nightmare on Elm Street film he is directing. Heather is hesitant as she has a stalker and is reluctant to do another horror film. After several nightmares of a disfigured man, Craven tells her she is the target of an ancient entity taking on a scarier form of Freddy. As Nancy is Freddy's original nemesis, this being must kill her to be set free. The film has Heather become one with Nancy when her son Dylan (Miko Hughes) is sedated, with her obtaining the white streak and wearing her pajamas inspired by the original film. Embodying Nancy, she enters the dream world and combats the entity, saving her son.

In the 2010 remake, Nancy's last name is "Holbrook," portrayed by Rooney Mara. (Note: The reasoning behind her surname change is unknown.) She is depicted as a depressed, goth girl and an aspiring art student, living with her single mother Gwen. When people in Nancy's high school begin dying in their sleep, she joins her boyfriend Quentin Smith (Kyle Gallner) in an investigation into their shared nightmares. Nancy's mother (Connie Britton) admits to them that all the kids in the preschool were molested by a man named Fred Krueger, the school gardener. She claims that Freddy fled the area before they could turn him in and that their dreams of Freddy are just repressed memories. After learning the truth about Freddy's death they assumed he was innocent, until they found his photos of themselves as children. After Nancy realizes she can pull things out of her dreams and hallucinations, they plan to pull him into the real world and kill him. After killing him, they burn down the preschool with Freddy's corpse inside, and they escape. The film ends ambiguously with Freddy killing her mother.

=== Literature ===
The character appears in the 1991 short story collection The Nightmares on Elm Street: Freddy Krueger's Seven Sweetest Dreams. In the story "Asleep at the Wheel," Freddy and Nancy are long dead, and they are considered urban legends or the result of mass hysteria due to Springwood's infamous history. The band Nancy Thompson Grave Watch, which includes songwriter and guitarist Ian, rents the dilapidated house at 1428 Elm Street for musical inspiration. Nancy's spirit appears in Ian's dreams to warn him that Freddy is real. Nancy and the events of Dream Warriors are mentioned in the story "Le Morte De Freddy".

Nancy returned in Nightmares on Elm Street, a canonical six-issue comic book series published by Innovation Comics from 1991 to 1992. In the story, Nancy teams up with several other characters from the film series, including Neil Gordon, Jacob Johnson, and Alice Johnson, to fight Freddy in his nightmare world. The events of this series were meant to fill in the period between A Nightmare on Elm Street 5: The Dream Child and Freddy's Dead: The Final Nightmare films, written by Andy Mangels. The first two issues of the story explain to the readers about Nancy's life in between the first and third films. After the events of the first film, Nancy is institutionalized. In college, she studied psychology and sleep disorders and made two friends in her roommates Cybil Houch and Priscilla Martin. After Nancy dies in Dream Warriors, Kristen had dreamed her soul into the Beautiful Dream, the good side of the dream world, where Nancy now acts as its agent as Freddy acts as an agent for the nightmare realm. The next four issues, titled Loose Ends, deals with the characters from previous Nightmare movies teaming up to defeat Freddy again. Nancy defeats Freddy and manages to stop his plan of using Jacob Johnson to break into the real world with help from Neil Gordon and Devonne, a psychotic former accomplice of Freddy's.

Nancy makes an appearance in the final issue of the crossover comic series Freddy vs. Jason vs. Ash: The Nightmare Warriors. In a battle against Freddy Krueger, Dream Master Jacob Johnson summons the spirits of Freddy's past victims, including Amanda Krueger and the Dream Warriors. Nancy also appears, reuniting with Neil Gordon to help him read the Necronomicons' passages needed to banish Freddy. With Freddy defeated, Nancy leaves Neil and returns to the afterlife with the other spirits.

== In popular culture ==
Nancy shown among the "Dream Warriors" in the Commodore 64/MS-DOS game.

Nancy is a playable character in the A Nightmare on Elm Street (1989) video game. Released by Monarch Software and Westwood Associates, Nancy and the Dream Warriors face Freddy Krueger once again. As each character has a dream power, Nancy can freeze enemies.

Nancy has accumulated a large following in the gay community since her 1984 cinematic debut. Freddy Krueger actor Robert Englund recollects the popularity of the Nancy character within the community upon attending a costume party in 1985 and seeing numerous drag queens dressed as Nancy in full drag, wearing her pajamas with the embroidery, and the white streak. Englund interprets this large following as a result of Heather Langenkamp having a "Judy Garland in The Wizard of Oz element to her", as well as the community identifying with the "strong" and "survivor" aspects of her.

In the Bollywood adaption called Mahakaal (1993) by the Ramsay Brothers, Nancy's analogue is called Anita and is played by actress Archana Puran Singh. Much like the original Nancy, Anita is the daughter of a policeman who killed Shakaal (the placeholder for Freddy's character) for murdering his young daughter, Anita's sister, as deleted scenes from Wes Craven's film hinted. She and her friends are college students instead of attending high school like Nancy. Anita has been criticized for being overly passive and doing little more than running away and screaming.

Nancy is featured in two figures by toy company Mezco Toyz. Jada Toys included Nancy alongside Freddy in the release of the die-cast model car of the 1958 Cadillac from the original film. Nancy is mentioned in Quentin Smith's biography in the video game Dead by Daylight. Additionally, a variety of Freddy's in-game power-ups are named after Nancy. Artist Matthew Therrien included Nancy alongside Freddy in his "Final Girls & Cinema Survivors" digital series. In 2019, as a part of a series of horror movie poster variant covers, visual artist Yasmine Putri created a piece for the DCeased #2 that featured Poison Ivy as Nancy and Batman as Freddy in a homage to the original poster for A Nightmare on Elm Street (1984).

== Characterization ==
“The heroic thing about Nancy in Nightmare 1 was that she refused to sleep: she refused to accept her parents' lies, her boyfriend's urging to ignore it all and just get in bed, her girlfriend's urging to have some drugs. She stayed awake, she took responsibility for being a conscious human being, and it's the one thing that saved her life while everybody else slept and died. The people who opt for that course of self-willed consciousness — of facing painful truths and dealing with them — are the only people that ultimately will survive. All the others are chaff."
— Wes Craven on the heroic aspects of Nancy

Nancy's characterization, along with Langenkamp's performance, has received praise. American literary critic John Kenneth Muir highlighted her intelligence and insightfulness for her original appearance. Muir describes her dysfunctional home life as attributing to her preparedness and courage to face the dark truth (Freddy Krueger). He attests her turning her back on him in the end counters against her character trait of facing things.

In a 2011 thesis, writer Kyle Christensen wrote that Nancy is one of the more strong representations of feminism in cinema. He cites her interactions with several male characters, noting she is not submissive to any of them and is, therefore, self-reliant and in control of her sexuality, unlike many other popular heroines within the genre.

Professor Carol J. Clover, the creator of the "final girl" theory, describes Nancy as the "grittiest of the Final Girls" in her 1992 non-fiction book Men, Women, and Chainsaws. Clover's inclusion of Nancy in this theory, however, has been both agreed with and challenged. Writer Shannon Keating states she surpasses the stereotypes of this trope coined by Clover and refers to Nancy as Freddy's equal in audience popularity.

Similarly, writer Don Sumner dismisses Nancy's association to this trope, analyzing her as an antithesis to it despite following the chaste aspects of it. Sumner states the victimization of women in horror films does not apply to Nancy due to her proactive nature. Sumner states that because of this character trait, she broke the mold for horror heroines. Psychologist Kelly Bulkeley compares Nancy to Dorothy Gale in The Wizard of Oz in that they both find their inner strength within their dreams to conquer what's troubling them in the real world.

Author Barbara Creed highlights the dysfunctional relationship that Nancy has with her parents and how her intense yearning for parental love leads to her demise in A Nightmare on Elm Street 3: Dream Warriors. Film critic James Berardinelli writes that A Nightmare on Elm Street is Nancy's story rather than Freddy's and attests similarities to Sigourney Weaver as Ellen Ripley in Alien (1979) due to her resourcefulness.

== Legacy ==
Nancy Thompson served as a major inspiration and named based for Nancy Wheeler from Stranger Things.
