= The China Lake Murders =

1990 American TV film directed by Alan Metzger

- Genre: Mystery; Thriller
- Written by: N.D. Schreiner
- Directed by: Alan Metzger
- Starring: Isaac Allan; Tom Skerritt; Michael Parks
- Music by: Dana Kaproff
- Country of origin: United States
- Original language: English

Production
- Executive producers: James G. Hirsch; Robert A. Papazian
- Producer: William Beaudine Jr.
- Cinematography: Geoffrey Schaaf
- Editor: Sidney Wolinsky
- Running time: 97 min
- Production companies: MCA Television Entertainment; Papazian-Hirsch Entertainment International

Original release
- Network: USA Network
- Release: January 31, 1990

The China Lake Murders is a 1990 television film starring Tom Skerritt. It is about a small desert town that experiences a series of murders. The film was rated PG-13 and first aired on the USA Network and for many years held the record for the highest rated basic cable film. It is an adaptation of the 1983 short film China Lake by Robert Harmon.

== Synopsis ==
The sheriff of China Lake is confronted with a series of grisly murders that have shocked the small desert town. During the investigation, he befriends a vacationing highway patrolman who is eager to join in the investigation. As facts about the killings surface, the sheriff is forced to put his new friendship to the test.

== Cast ==
- Tom Skerritt as Sheriff Sam Brodie
- Michael Parks as Officer Jack Donnelly
- Lauren Tewes as Kitty
- Nancy Everhard as Cindy
- Doug Mears as Deputy Bobby
- Gary McGurk as Wyler
- Bill McKinney as Captain Finney
- Hans Howes as Assistant Watch Commander
- Tom Dahlgren as Lewis Harrelson
- Lara Parker as Helene Harrelson
- David L. Crowley as Unknown
- Lonny Chapman as Unknown
- J.C. Quinn as Unknown
- Mary Maldonado as Enid
- Jack Kehler as "Germ"
- Dennis Rucker as Police Sergeant
- Danny Hassel as Highway Patrol Officer
- Roger Rook as Handcuffed Man
