= Andrew Prowse =

Australian editor and film director (died 2018)

Andrew Prowse was an Australian editor, writer and director of film and television. He was nominated for Best Editing at the 1986 AFI Awards for Playing Beatie Bow. Prowse was also co-producer of the 2014 telemovie INXS: Never Tear Us Apart.

Prowse died in December 2018.

== Select credits ==
- Midnite Spares (1983)
- Run, Chrissie, Run! (1984)
- Playing Beatie Bow (1986)
- Fair Game (1986)
- The Time Guardian (1987)
- Driving Force (1989)
- The Siege of Firebase Gloria (1989)
- Demonstone (1990)
- Ultraman: Towards the Future (1990)
- Farscape (1999 - 2004)
- Heatstroke (2008)
