= Jeff Katz =

American film producer, talk radio host and comic book author

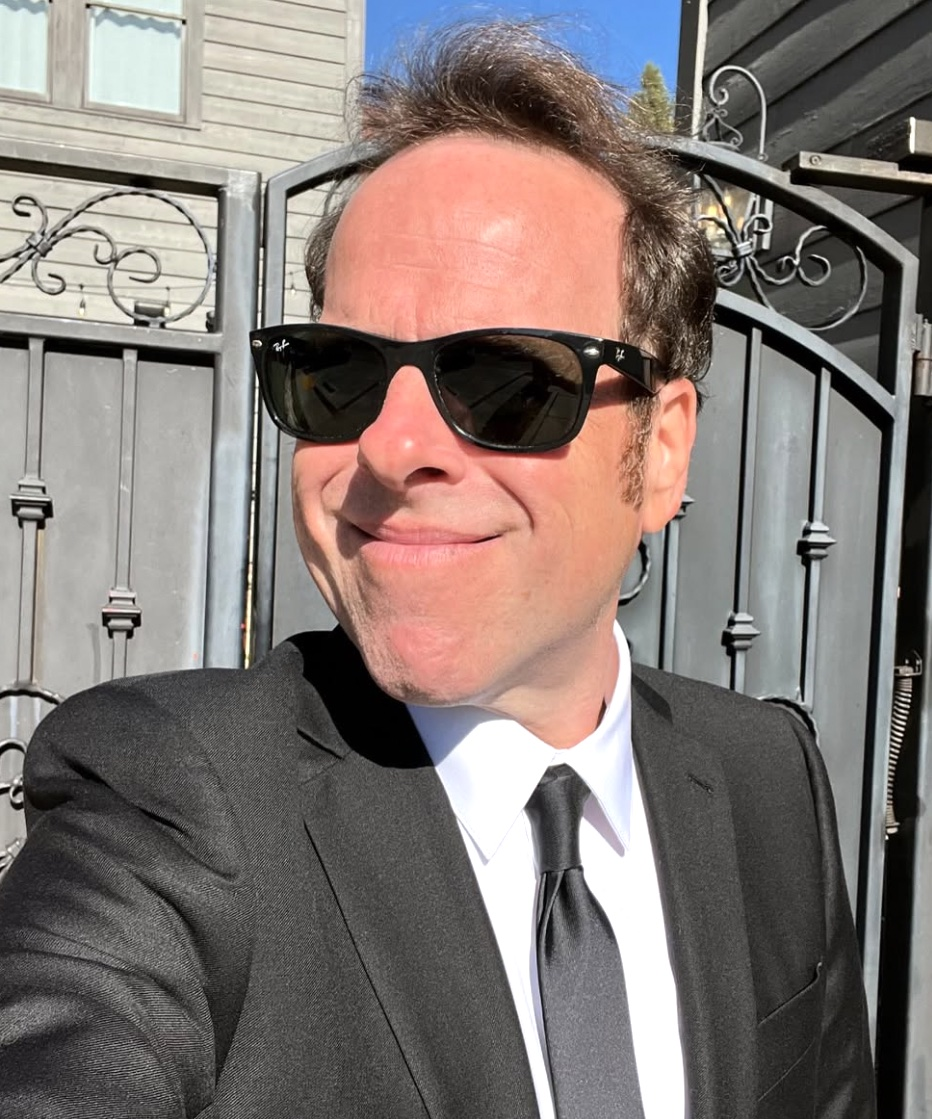
- Born: Franklin, Michigan
- Occupations: Film producer, Comic book writer, Screenwriter, Radio host, Wrestling promoter
- Notable work: The Pope's Exorcist; Freddy vs. Jason; Snakes on a Plane; Shoot 'Em Up; X-Men Origins: Wolverine; Deadpool; Booster Gold; Freddy vs. Jason vs. Ash

Jeff Katz is an American film producer and comic book author, best known for genre movies such as The Pope's Exorcist, Snakes On A Plane and Freddy vs. Jason.

== Early life ==
Katz is from Franklin, Michigan. He started a pen-pal relationship with New Line Cinema founder and future boss Bob Shaye after meeting Shaye's father at a dinner party as an eight year old boy. As a teenager, Katz achieved some measure of local fame, including a feature on NBC's The Today Show, as the host of an AM talk radio show on WDFN, which at the time was a sports talk radio station. His radio guests included Jeff Bagwell, Bob Arum, Marv Albert, Mr. T and, notably, several professional wrestlers including Hulk Hogan, Ric Flair, Jimmy Hart and Sherri Martel. It was in this role that he would first catch the eye of World Championship Wrestling executives Eric Bischoff and Zane Bresloff, who would eventually hire Katz for WCW. Katz briefly attended Michigan State before dropping out after accepting an internship at New Line in Los Angeles.

== Career ==
=== Film producer ===
Katz, arriving in Los Angeles on his 20th birthday, first worked as an unpaid intern for New Line Cinema where he eventually became a studio executive and film producer, producing Freddy vs. Jason at 24 years old, followed by Snakes on a Plane, Shoot 'Em Up and Normal Adolescent Behavior. While serving as a studio executive at New Line, during the production of Blade: Trinity, he thought Ryan Reynolds was the only actor suitable for the role of Deadpool and championed the idea with the support of Marvel's Avi Arad and Kevin Feige. However, rights issues emerged with 20th Century Fox and their X-Men films, and the project did not move forward with that studio. Katz subsequently moved to 20th Century Fox, finally bringing the Ryan Reynolds deal over to the studio, where he worked on productions such as Deadpool, X-Men Origins: Wolverine, X-Men: First Class and The A-Team while there. Katz was named one of Variety's "10 Producers to Watch" and was also named a member of The Hollywood Reporter's annual "35 Under 35."

Katz also appears as an interview subject in several documentaries including Never Sleep Again: The Elm Street Legacy, Going to Pieces: The Rise and Fall of the Slasher Film, Halloween: 25 Years of Terror, His Name Was Jason: 30 Years of Friday The 13th and Crystal Lake Memories: The Complete History of Friday the 13th.

He most recently produced The Pope's Exorcist starring Russell Crowe and based on the life of Father Gabriele Amorth for Sony Pictures and Screen Gems, for which he also received a story credit. The film has grossed $77 million on a budget of $18 million and a sequel is in development.

=== Wrestling promotion ===
Katz began his career in pro wrestling at World Championship Wrestling in 1996, when he was hired by Eric Bischoff at the age of 17. He would spend his late teens alternating between high school and traveling for WCW during the Monday Night War. Katz primarily handled play-by-play on PPV events for online streaming alongside color commentator Mark Madden and wrote columns for WCW's print and online outlets. He briefly took over for Gene Okerlund on the WCW hotline during Okerlund's absence, ultimately shifting to his own segment on the hotline following Okerlund's eventual return. He would later shift to hosting a weekly segment on the breakaway New World Order hotline. Katz also served as host of the infamous Ms. NWO pageant at the Souled Out (1997) PPV event. He would eventually segue out of WCW upon his move to Los Angeles to intern at New Line Cinema.

During his later Hollywood career, he briefly returned to wrestling in early 2011, while venting frustrations via his Twitter page with the current wrestling product broadcast worldwide by companies such as WWE and TNA. In May 2011, he began a fundraising drive via the crowdfunding website Kickstarter with a goal to raise $100,000 for an alternative wrestling venture. By June 21, 2011, the goal was achieved through 187 pledges, and became the Wrestling Retribution Project. A thirteen-week first season was taped from October 10 to 12, 2011, at the Henson Recording Studios in Los Angeles, California.

The WRP concept featured a standalone story universe that didn't acknowledge any outside wrestling history or existing promotions like World Wrestling Entertainment. The roster of wrestling talent all played entirely new characters created by Katz, who workshopped the new characters with each performer during pre-production. The series format was designed to feature a full beginning, middle and end similar to the structure of a film or limited television series, including darker themes and characterizations than common to most wrestling programming.

The WRP roster included several prominent wrestling talents and rising stars, including Kenny Omega, who would win the series championship beating Dr. Luther in the finale. Other names involved with the production include MVP, Chris Hero, Karl Anderson, Colt Cabana, Luke Gallows, Amazing Red, Timothy Thatcher, Brian Cage, L. A. Knight, Shawn Daivari, Emil Sitoci, Sami Callihan, Alex Reynolds, Adam Pearce, Joey Ryan, Pat Buck, "Psycho" Mike Rollins and more. Acting as agents and producers for the WRP tapings were Christopher Daniels, Lance Storm and Tommy Dreamer. Katz returned to play-by-play for the first time since WCW for the tapings, being joined by Nigel McGuinness (as "Vyvyan Edmondson") on color commentary.

WRP was never released in the promised episodic format, but the filmed footage was uploaded to YouTube by Katz in March 2020, followed shortly thereafter by audio commentaries, behind the scenes footage and additional filmed materials from WRP's sister series The Underground starring The Young Bucks for AwesomenessTV.

Katz would ultimately return to wrestling during promotion of The Pope's Exorcist, putting together a partnership with WWE at WrestleMania, including the sponsorship of the Hell In A Cell match between Edge (wrestler) and Finn Balor. The promotion included an appearance from star Russell Crowe to introduce the match during the lowering of the cage. The film's logo also appeared on the backdrop of the post-event press conference as well.

In 2024, WRP's lineage would be reborn as the PWA Champions Grail was established as the championship for Scott D'Amore's revived Maple Leaf Pro Wrestling with partners Qatar Pro Wrestling and Oceania Pro Wrestling - collectively the Pro Wrestling Alliance - merging WRP's 2011 championship won by Kenny Omega with the 1962 Japanese Wrestling Association Toyonaka tournament trophy won by Rikidozan & Toyonobori and now owned by Katz. The PWA Champion's Grail is currently held by "Ravenous" Rohan Raja, who defeated Jake Something to win the title at MLP Forged in Excellence in October 2024. Under Raja, the PWA Champion's Grail has been successfully defended across the globe including India, Qatar, Australia and Canada.

=== Comics career ===
In 2005, Katz began writing for Image Comics, making his comics debut in a short story for The Wicked West. He wrote Freddy vs. Jason vs. Ash and the sequel Freddy vs. Jason vs. Ash: The Nightmare Warriors based on his experience with the Freddy vs. Jason film for DC imprint WildStorm, which was preceded by a successful run at DC Comics proper, on titles such as Booster Gold with co-writer Geoff Johns and artist Dan Jurgens. He created the action-adventure comic Crosshair for Top Cow, which was optioned to Lionsgate for film. He is the co-creator of the DC Comics villain Black Beetle.

Katz began his own comic book production company, American Original.

== Personal life ==
Katz lives in Los Angeles.
