= Jason Craig =

American comic book artist

- Born: June 26, 1974 (age 52)
- Areas: Penciller, Inker
- Notable works: Freddy vs. Jason vs. Ash, Evil Ernie

Jason Craig (born June 26, 1974) is an American comic book artist.

== Career ==
Jason Craig was born at Eglin Air Force Base in Niceville, Florida. He started his career in Chicago, in 1991, working on and off for various publishers before moving away to pursue a full-time career in advertising. Following a near-fatal automobile accident in 2002, Craig was placed into a coma briefly and spent the following year in physical rehab, after which he returned to Chicago to continue his career in comics.

Craig's most notable work in the comics' industry has been for WildStorm Comics, drawing Freddy vs. Jason vs. Ash and its sequel.

Craig drew the reboot issues of the comic series Evil Ernie, written by Jesse Blaze Snider. The first issue was released in October 2012.
