= Nancy Everhard =

American actress (born 1957)

- Born: November 30, 1957 (age 68); Wadsworth, Ohio, U.S.
- Occupation: Actress
- Years active: 1982–2006
- Spouse: Tom Amandes (m. 1996)
- Children: 3

Nancy Everhard (born November 30, 1957) is an American former actress. She became known for her roles in the films DeepStar Six (1989) and The Punisher (1989). She also appeared in television series such as Reasonable Doubts (1991–1993), The Untouchables (1993–1994), and Everwood (2002–2004).

== Life and career ==
Everhard was born in Wadsworth, Ohio. She debuted in a small supporting role in the 1982 TV movie Born Beautiful.

She guest-starred on TV series Remington Steele, in the third-season episode, "Steele in the Family", as Clarissa. She reprised the character in the fourth-season episode, "Bonds of Steele".

After numerous guest appearances in television series, she appeared in 1989 in the horror movie Demonstone, with Jan-Michael Vincent, in a larger role. In the sci-fi horror film DeepStar Six (1989), she also guest starred with Jan Micheal Vincent on his Airwolf tv series season three in Eagles. she played a woman in the crew of an underwater station who survived the attack of a monster. In the action film The Punisher (1989), she appeared alongside Dolph Lundgren, Louis Gossett Jr., and Jeroen Krabbé. In 1990, she appeared as the love interest of Tom Skerritt's character in The China Lake Murders, which for many years held the record for the highest-rated basic cable film.

In 1991, Everhard played the love interest of Gregory Harrison's lead character on the CBS sitcom The Family Man. Shortly thereafter, she played Kay Lockman in the first season of the NBC legal drama Reasonable Doubts alongside Mark Harmon. She then co-starred as Catherine Ness in the syndicated version of The Untouchables, with her future husband, Tom Amandes. From 2002 to 2004, Everhard had a regular role on the WB drama Everwood, again working with Amandes, who played Dr. Hal Abbott on the series.

== Personal life ==
Everhard married actor Tom Amandes in 1996; she met him during the filming of the television series The Untouchables. They have three children together.

== Filmography ==
- 1982 – Born Beautiful as Model In Red Hot
- 1985 – Family Ties, season three, episode 20: "Don't Know Much About History..." as Robin Green
- 1986 – Knight Rider, season four, episode 14: "Out of the Woods" as Samantha Dutton
- 1986 – Airwolf, season three, episode seven: "Eagles" as Roan Carver
- 1989 – Demonstone as Sharon Gale
- 1989 – DeepStar Six as Joyce Collins
- 1989 – The Trial of the Incredible Hulk as Christa Klein
- 1989 – The Punisher as Detective Samantha "Sam" Leary
- 1989 – An Eight is Enough Wedding as Marlyn "Mike" Fulbright
- 1990 – Another 48 Hrs. as Female Doctor
- 1990 – The China Lake Murders as Cindy
- 1991–1992 – Reasonable Doubts as Kay Lockman
- 1992–1994 – Renegade as Attorney Rainwater "R.W." Thackery / Jessica Patterson
- 1993 – The Untouchables as Catherine Ness
- 1994 – Lois & Clark: The New Adventures of Superman as Linda King
- 1994 – Time Trax as Jobeth Saunders
- 1997 – JAG (episode "Crossing the Line") as Lieutenant Marilyn Isaacs
- 2001 - CSI: Crime Scene Investigation, season two, episode ten: "Ellie" as Special Agent Tessari aka Mrs. Orton aka Mrs. Duffy
- 2002–2004 – Everwood as Sharon Hart
- 2005 – Urban Legends: Bloody Mary as Pam Owens
