= List of A Nightmare on Elm Street characters =

Production still of the cast from A Nightmare on Elm Street during a take of the film's ending. Top left to bottom right: Jsu Garcia (as Nick Corri), Amanda Wyss, Johnny Depp (in his first film role), Heather Langenkamp and Robert Englund.

The A Nightmare on Elm Street series, created by Wes Craven, focuses on several characters who survive attacks by Freddy Krueger (Robert Englund), the spirit of a child murderer who gains the ability to stalk and kill people in their dreams (thus killing them in reality) after his death at the hands of a vengeful mob.

The series consists of nine films: A Nightmare on Elm Street (1984), A Nightmare on Elm Street 2: Freddy's Revenge (1985), A Nightmare on Elm Street 3: Dream Warriors (1987), A Nightmare on Elm Street 4: The Dream Master (1988), A Nightmare on Elm Street 5: The Dream Child (1989) and Freddy's Dead: The Final Nightmare (1991), in which Freddy is seemingly killed. A demonic interpretation followed in Wes Craven's New Nightmare (1994), in which Freddy Krueger attempts to break free from the films into the real world. Nearly a decade later, Freddy was involved in a crossover with Jason Voorhees of the Friday the 13th franchise in Freddy vs. Jason (2003). The series was rebooted in 2010 with A Nightmare On Elm Street, a loose remake of the original film with Englund replaced by Jackie Earle Haley and the character changed from child killer to a child molester. The franchise also consists of a television series, a video game, merchandise and literature about Freddy Krueger and his exploits, including crossovers with Jason Voorhees and Ash Williams of the Evil Dead franchise.

In the series Freddy Krueger has the ability to enter people's dreams and control them, taunting and murdering them with his glove (with four blades attached to the fingers, allowing him to slash and stab his victims). Nancy Thompson (Heather Langenkamp) survives his attacks in the original film, and appeared in Dream Warriors. She was replaced by Alice Johnson (Lisa Wilcox) as the protagonist of the fourth and fifth installments, who has special abilities in her dreams which allow her to fight Freddy's machinations. Killed off by his daughter Maggie Burroughs (Lisa Zane) in Freddy's Dead: The Final Nightmare, he returns in subsequent media. In the 2010 franchise reboot starring Jackie Earle Haley as Freddy, the character is changed from a child murderer to a child molester (Craven's intention in the original films). His bladed glove is a gardening tool instead of a handmade item, as in the original film series.

Although some films in the series were critical and financial flops, it is considered one of the most successful media franchises in the US. The series contained the first film appearances of Johnny Depp (A Nightmare on Elm Street) and Patricia Arquette (Dream Warriors), both of whom went on to successful, award-winning careers.

== Recurring cast and characters ==
Character	Original series						Standalone film	Crossover	Remake	Television series
Character	A Nightmare on Elm Street	A Nightmare on Elm Street 2: Freddy's Revenge	A Nightmare on Elm Street 3: Dream Warriors	A Nightmare on Elm Street 4: The Dream Master	A Nightmare on Elm Street 5: The Dream Child	Freddy's Dead: The Final Nightmare	Wes Craven's New Nightmare	Freddy vs. Jason	A Nightmare on Elm Street	Freddy's Nightmares
Character	1984	1985	1987	1988	1989	1991	1994	2003	2010	1988–1990
Freddy Krueger	Robert Englund	Robert Englund	Robert Englund	Robert Englund	Robert Englund	Robert Englund	Robert Englund	Robert Englund	Jackie Earle Haley	Robert Englund
Nancy Thompson	Heather Langenkamp	Mentioned	Heather Langenkamp				Heather Langenkamp	Heather Langenkamp (Flashback)	Rooney Mara (as Nancy Holbrook)	
Donald Thompson	John Saxon		John Saxon				John Saxon			
Marge Thompson	Ronee Blakely	Mentioned							Connie Britton (as Gwen Holbrook)	
Tina Gray	Amanda Wyss						Amanda Wyss (Archive footage)	Amanda Wyss (Flashback)	Katie Cassidy (as Kris Fowles)	
Glen Lantz	Johnny Depp	Mentioned				Johnny Depp (as Teen on TV)			Kyle Gallner (as Quentin Smith)	
Rod Lane	Nick Corri						Nick Corri		Thomas Dekker (as Jesse Braun)	
Jesse Walsh		Mark Patton						Mark Patton (Flashback)		
Kristen Parker			Patricia Arquette	Tuesday Knight				Patricia Arquette (Flashback)		
Joey Crusel			Rodney Eastman	Rodney Eastman				Rodney Eastman (Flashback)		
Roland Kincaid			Ken Sagoes	Ken Sagoes				Ken Sagoes (Flashback)		
Amanda Krueger			Nan Martin		Beatrice Boepple					
Alice Johnson				Lisa Wilcox	Lisa Wilcox			Lisa Wilcox (Flashback)		
Dan Jordan				Danny Hassel	Danny Hassel					

== A Nightmare on Elm Street (1984) ==
=== Donald Thompson ===
- Played by John Saxon
- Appeared in A Nightmare on Elm Street, A Nightmare on Elm Street 3, Wes Craven's New Nightmare

Donald "Don" Thompson is the father of Nancy Thompson and Marge Thompson's ex-husband. Years before the events of the first film, he participates in the murder of Fred Krueger when Krueger was freed on a technicality after a series of child murders. After this, he divorces Nancy's mother. When Tina Gray is murdered, Don (a lieutenant in the Springwood police department) uses his daughter as bait to capture Rod Lane, the suspected killer. After Rod's apparent suicide, Don ignores Nancy's reports about a resurrected Freddy Krueger and fails to help her; he and his daughter become estranged. Don realizes that Nancy was right about Freddy, and Rod did not kill Tina. He becomes an alcoholic, and loses his job.

In A Nightmare on Elm Street 3, Freddy resumes his attacks on children at a clinic where Nancy works. She and Neil Gordon visit Don and persuade him to reveal the location of Freddy's body so it can be properly buried, believing that this would force Freddy into the afterlife. When they uncover his body, Freddy seizes control of his skeleton. He kills Don by impaling him with the metal fin of a Cadillac. Freddy later poses as Don to trick Nancy into dropping her guard, allowing him to fatally stab her.

In the Nightmares on Elm Street comic miniseries, Don has been trapped and tortured since his death in Freddy's realm. When Freddy breaks through into the real world, he forces Don to summon and kill Nancy's spirit in exchange for freedom. Although Don shoots her, Nancy has become similar in power to Freddy. She forgives her father, and uses her powers to free him into the afterlife. Don has a cameo appearance in Wes Craven's New Nightmare. Donald Thompson is mentioned briefly in the novels A Nightmare on Elm Street: Suffer the Children and A Nightmare on Elm Street: Perchance to Dream as being the first one to start the fire that led to Freddy's death. The comic Nightmare on Elm Street: The Beginning features Don initially attempting to stop the mob after Freddy, then joining them once the killer threatens Nancy.

=== Freddy Krueger ===
- Played by Robert Englund
- Appeared in A Nightmare on Elm Street, A Nightmare on Elm Street 2, A Nightmare on Elm Street 3, A Nightmare on Elm Street 4, A Nightmare on Elm Street 5, Freddy's Dead: The Final Nightmare, Wes Craven's New Nightmare, Freddy Vs Jason, Freddy Vs Jason Vs Ash, Freddy Vs Jason Vs Ash: Nightmare Warriors, and Freddy Vs Jason Vs Michael Vs Leatherface

Frederick Charles "Freddy" Krueger (a.k.a. The Springwood Slasher) is a child killer who is responsible for the kidnapping and murder of several children before he is captured. He is released due to a legal technicality, and the parents of the murdered children burn him alive. After his death, Freddy gains the ability to infiltrate and control dreams; he uses this to stalk and murder the remaining children on Elm Street. Despite several defeats, Freddy repeatedly resurrects himself and continues trying to kill children.

=== Glen Lantz ===
- Played by Johnny Depp
- Appeared in A Nightmare on Elm Street

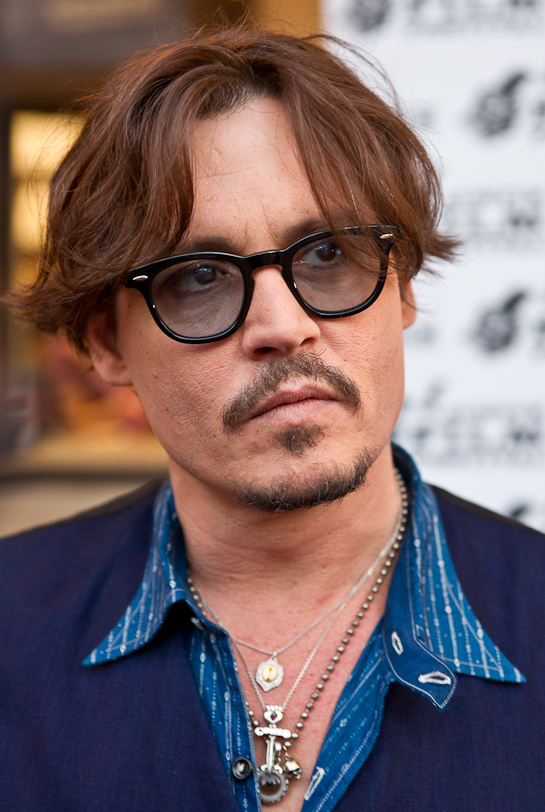
A Nightmare on Elm Street was Johnny Depp's first film role.

Glen Lantz, a student at Springwood High, is Nancy Thompson's boyfriend. Before the film's events (and unbeknownst to Glen), his parents participated in the murder of Fred Krueger. He begins having a series of tormenting nightmares of a man who turns out to be Krueger's spirit, does not tell his friends, and would not let them keep him from getting some sleep, believing that they are just dreams. When his friends Tina and Rod die, Glen does not believe that their dreams were responsible. Nancy prepares to confront Krueger in her dreams, and asks Glen to stay awake and wake her at a predetermined time to help her escape danger. Glen falls asleep; Nancy cannot awaken him because of interference from his father, Walter, who sees her as a bad influence. Freddy pulls Glen through his bed and murders him, sending a stream of blood vertically through the bed up to the ceiling. Glen's body emerges from the hole of the mattress and falls, hitting the bed; Nancy later finds his headphones in Freddy's realm. Nancy turns her back on Freddy, apparently draining his powers, and dreams that all her friends (including Glen) and her mother are alive. Nancy and her friends go out; the car Glen is driving is revealed as possessed by Freddy. Locked in, with Glen not knowing what is happening, they go down the street as the film ends.

Glen's death was mentioned by a limousine driver in Wes Craven's New Nightmare.

This was Depp's first film role and he performed his own stunts in the bedroom death scene. Depp returned to the film series when he made a cameo appearance as Teen on TV in Freddy's Dead: The Final Nightmare, in which he presents a This Is Your Brain on Drugs public service announcement (watched by Spencer) before Freddy hits him on the head with the PSA's frying pan.

=== Marge Thompson ===
- Played by Ronee Blakley
- Appeared in A Nightmare on Elm Street

Marge Thompson is the mother of Nancy Thompson and Donald Thompson's ex-wife. An alcoholic and a heavy smoker, she struggles with Nancy's growing instability from sleep deprivation and nightmares and depends on alcohol and cigarettes to help her cope. Pressured by Nancy, Marge reveals that Freddy was a child murderer who was freed on a legal technicality. She and Donald participated in Krueger's murder with other parents who lived on their street, including Glen's, Tina's and Rod's. Marge shows Nancy Krueger's glove (which is hidden in their boiler) in an attempt to convince her daughter that he is dead and cannot hurt her. However, Marge is still afraid that Krueger is somehow still alive and seeking revenge; she installs locks on the doors and bars on the windows to keep Nancy in and Krueger out. When Nancy pulls Freddy into the real world in her dream, he finds and kills Marge by suffocating her and burning her to death with his fiery body.

After Nancy defeats him, she finds her mother alive and well and runs off to join her friends. Marge waves to her and Freddy's arm bursts through the window, pulling Marge in to an unseen fate. In A Nightmare on Elm Street 3, Nancy says that her mother died in her sleep.

=== Nancy Thompson ===
- Played by Heather Langenkamp
- Appeared in A Nightmare on Elm Street, A Nightmare on Elm Street 3, Wes Craven's New Nightmare, Nightmares on Elm Street, The Nightmares on Elm Street: Freddy Krueger's Seven Sweetest Dreams ("Asleep at the Wheel"), and Freddy vs. Jason vs. Ash: The Nightmare Warriors

Nancy and her friends are targeted by Freddy Krueger in nightmares about a disfigured, threatening man. After the death of her best friend Tina, Nancy suspects that the dreams are real; when she learns who Krueger was and realizes that he is seeking revenge against the people who killed him by murdering their children, she searches for ways to defeat him. After he kills Glen, Nancy tries to bring Krueger into the real world to defeat him herself.

In A Nightmare on Elm Street 3 she is an intern specializing in nightmare disorders at the Westin Hills hospital, helping children who are dreaming of Freddy Krueger. With the children, she apparently defeats Freddy; however, he uses the guise of her father to get near her and stabs her in the abdomen. Before Nancy dies, she stops Krueger from killing Kristen by stabbing him with his own glove.

As Heather Langenkamp, she is a main character in Wes Craven's New Nightmare because the film overlaps reality. At the end, she finally destroys Freddy. Heather then finds a copy of the film's screenplay, with thanks from Wes for defeating Freddy and playing Nancy one last time. Nancy appears as a spirit in the comic-book crossover Freddy vs. Jason vs. Ash: The Nightmare Warriors, where she helps Neil Gordon use the Necronomicon to cast Freddy into hell.

=== Rod Lane ===
- Played by Nick Corri
- Appeared in: A Nightmare on Elm Street

Rod Lane, a Springwood High student and Tina Gray's boyfriend, has a criminal record for drugs and violence. Like Tina, Nancy and Glen, Rod has nightmares but refuses to accept them as meaningful; he is also unaware that his and his friends' parents participated in the murder of Fred Krueger years earlier. After Rod sleeps with Tina, she is murdered in a dream by Freddy and apparently killed by an invisible attacker on Rod. Rod is arrested on suspicion of murder, and no one believes his pleas of innocence because of his past. He tells Nancy (who visits him in jail) about his Freddy Krueger nightmares, leading her to the conclusion that a supernatural entity is haunting their street. Freddy kills him in his dreams, which makes his death look like a commits suicide by hanging himself with bedsheets. Corri made a cameo appearance as a fictitious version of himself in Wes Craven's New Nightmare. According to story outlines for an unfinished issue of the prequel comic, A Nightmare on Elm Street: The Beginning, Freddy drives Rod's father insane with nightmares, causing him to beat his wife in front of Rod and eventually commit suicide.

=== Tina Gray ===
- Played by Amanda Wyss
- Appeared in: A Nightmare on Elm Street

Christina "Tina" Gray, a Springwood high student, is Nancy's best friend. Tina tells Nancy that she has been experiencing strange dreams about a scarred man, and learns that Nancy has had a similar dream. Her parents had also participated in Fred Krueger's murder. Tina's father left his family shortly afterwards, and her mother began dating. One night, after sleeping with her boyfriend, Tina is attacked in a dream during a sleepover and murdered by Freddy Krueger, her body dragged up the wall and across the ceiling. Her boyfriend Rod is suspected and arrested. Freddy uses images of the dead Tina to torment Nancy when she falls asleep. Her death is echoed in Wes Craven's New Nightmare with Julie, and in the 2010 A Nightmare on Elm Street with Kris Fowles. Although Wyss did not appear in Wes Craven's New Nightmare, her character's death was mentioned by a limousine driver and footage from the first film was used.

In the original Freddy vs. Jason script by Damian Shannon and Mark J. Swift, Tina appears in Lori Campbell's first nightmare of Freddy Krueger. Bloody, affixed to the ceiling and wearing her blue nightshirt, she tells Lori: "Freddy is coming back. It's okay to be afraid, Lori. We were all afraid. Warn your friends ... warn all your friends."

== A Nightmare on Elm Street 2: Freddy's Revenge ==
=== Jesse Walsh ===
- Portrayed by Mark Patton
- Appeared in: A Nightmare on Elm Street 2

Jesse Walsh is a student who moves into Nancy Thompson's old house on Elm Street with his family and begins having nightmares about Freddy Krueger. He learns that his father paid a bargain price for the house; one of its previous owners had been mysteriously killed, and it is rumored to be haunted. Freddy possesses Jesse, using him to kill in the real world and slowly gaining the strength to manifest his own form. He uses his powers to kill Jesse's abusive coach, and tries to kill Jesse's sister; however, Jesse resists. He confides his fear to his friend Ron, and asks him to watch over him while he sleeps. Ron passes out; Freddy manifests, and murders him.

Jesse retreats to his girlfriend Lisa's house during a party, but Freddy again takes control and tries to kill her. Jesse fights back and Freddy turns on the other teenagers, murdering seven before disappearing. Freddy goes to the boiler room where he would bring his child victims before killing them. Lisa confronts him and Jesse regains control, exorcising Freddy. Lisa and Jesse's friend Kerry is later impaled through the chest by Freddy on their school bus; the bus careens off the road, revealing that Freddy is still alive and has again trapped Jesse (whose fate is uncertain).

Jesse and Freddy's relationship was intended to have a homoerotic subtext, with Freddy representing Jesse's fear of coming out. Critics noted the lack of interest Jesse shows in Lisa and his retreat to Ron's bedroom after a failed attempt to kiss her, implying that Ron is the object of Jesse's affection. At a gay S&M club he is confronted by Schneider, his homosexual gym teacher. Although the storyline is muted, Robert Englund and writer David Chaskin admitted the subtext; the casting of openly-gay actor Mark Patton as Jesse was deliberate.

In 2012, Patton published "Jesse's Lost Journal" online. Sixty-eight journal entries span the period from 1982 to 1985. The first 30 entries closely follow the events of A Nightmare on Elm Street 2: Freddy's Revenge, with details unseen on screen: hints that Jesse's father is a pedophile; Jesse's platonic love for Lisa; his homosexual feelings for a classmate, and his feeling that Nancy Thompson is a kindred spirit. Jesse supposedly kills Lisa Webber at the power plant rather than the film's final bus sequence, although she is later shown to have survived. The remaining 38 entries focus on Jesse's time in a psychiatric ward, his sentencing for murdering Ron Grady and the apparent disappearance of Lisa's body, his escape from the psychiatric institution, and his efforts to build a new identity. Jesse still wrestles with Freddy Krueger in his mind, and panics when Hollywood begins making the Nightmare on Elm Street films based on his and Nancy Thompson's journal entries.

=== Lisa Webber ===
- Played by Kim Myers
- Appeared in: A Nightmare on Elm Street 2

Lisa Webber is a wealthy and popular girl at Springwood High who is attracted to Jesse Walsh when he moves into her neighborhood. They begin dating, but Jesse becomes increasingly erratic under Freddy Krueger's influence. Lisa tries to convince Jesse that Freddy is dead until she sees him manifest in Jesse's body. Freddy tries to kill her, but her proclamations of love weaken his hold on Jesse (apparently allowing Jesse to banish him from his body). While riding on the school bus later with Jesse, their friend is impaled through the chest by Freddy; the bus careens off the road, revealing them as again trapped in a Freddy dream. Lisa's fate is also uncertain.

=== Ron Grady ===
- Played by Robert Rusler
- Appeared in: A Nightmare on Elm Street 2

Ron Grady, initially Jesse's rival, grows close to him while they are punished by Schneider. Jesse confides his fears about Freddy to Ron, and asks him to watch over him while he sleeps to make sure that Freddy does not gain control. Ron falls asleep, Freddy seizes control and transforms Jesse into Freddy, and murders Ron.

According to Robert Englund, a homoerotic subtext implies that Jesse is gay and Freddy is his fear of accepting that fact. Ron is the real object of Jesse's affection, implied when he leaves his girlfriend Lisa after a failed attempt at sex and retreats to Ron's room.

=== Kerry Hellman ===
- Played by Sydney Walsh
- Appeared in: A Nightmare on Elm Street 2

Lisa's best friend and confidant, who supports her crush on Jesse. Kerry is impaled by Freddy in a dream at the end of the movie, but it is unclear if that is the actual Kerry, or just a dream version of her appearing as an illusion to Jesse, Lisa or both.

=== Schneider ===
- Played by Marshall Bell
- Appeared in: A Nightmare on Elm Street 2

Schneider is Jesse and Ron's abusive coach. Unable to sleep and experiencing strange events around his home, Jesse wanders the streets and seeks shelter from the rain in a sadomasochistic nightclub. Schneider confronts him when he tries to drink, and forces him to run laps around the school track as punishment. While Jesse is showering, objects begin flying off shelves in Schneider's office and furniture moves around. A jump rope binds his arms, and he is dragged into the showers in front of Jesse. Freddy Krueger takes over Jesse's body and slashes Schneider's back, killing him.

=== Angela Walsh ===
- Played by Christie Clark
- Appeared in: A Nightmare on Elm Street 2

Angela Walsh is Jesse's younger, eleven-year-old sister. She is a minor character, appearing in a handful of scenes, however Krueger attempts to kill her while in possession of Jesse's body: late one night, Krueger creeps into Angela's room while she is asleep, and tries to kill her, but is thwarted by Jesse. Jesse also sees an apparition of Angela one night during a dream, in which she is wearing an old-fashioned white dress and playing jump rope, reciting Krueger's nursery rhyme.

== A Nightmare on Elm Street 3: Dream Warriors ==
=== Amanda Krueger ===
- Played by Nan Martin, Beatrice Boepple
- Appeared in: A Nightmare on Elm Street 3: Dream Warriors (Martin), A Nightmare on Elm Street 5 (Boepple), Freddy vs. Jason vs. Ash: Nightmare Warriors

Amanda Krueger is Freddy's mother. She decides to become a nun, chooses Mary Helena as her religious name and is assigned to Westin Hills Hospital. Amanda is accidentally locked inside with psychopaths and killers for several days at Christmastime. Beaten and raped, when she is found she is barely alive and pregnant. In September 1942, Amanda gives birth to Frederick Charles Krueger; she gives him up for adoption, rejecting her son because the circumstances of his conception make him "an abomination to God and to man". Amanda follows his trial for the murder of several children in Springwood, and supposedly hangs herself after his release; she actually bricks herself into a room in the tower of the hospital's abandoned psychiatric wing out of guilt, where she dies. Her body is never found, and she has an empty plot in Springwood Cemetery; like her son, her spirit is uneasy. As an elderly nun, Amanda returns to help Neil Gordon defeat Freddy. She returns in Dream Child in her young form, brought back by Freddy to resurrect him; her son keeps her from telling Alice how to stop him. When Alice tries to find Amanda in her dreams, Freddy lures her away by attacking her friend Yvonne (forcing Alice to rescue Yvonne). While Alice tries to fight Freddy, she sends Yvonne to Amanda's resting place to free her. Using Alice Johnson's child (Jacob Daniel Johnson) and his power to revert Freddy into a child, she absorbs him into herself in an attempt to contain him.

In the comic book series Freddy vs. Jason vs. Ash: The Nightmare Warriors, Amanda is summoned by Jacob to help defeat her son. Freddy wounds Jacob (weakening his power), making Amanda disappear.

=== Kristen Parker ===
- Played by Patricia Arquette, Tuesday Knight
- Appeared in: A Nightmare on Elm Street 3 (Arquette), A Nightmare on Elm Street 4 (Knight)

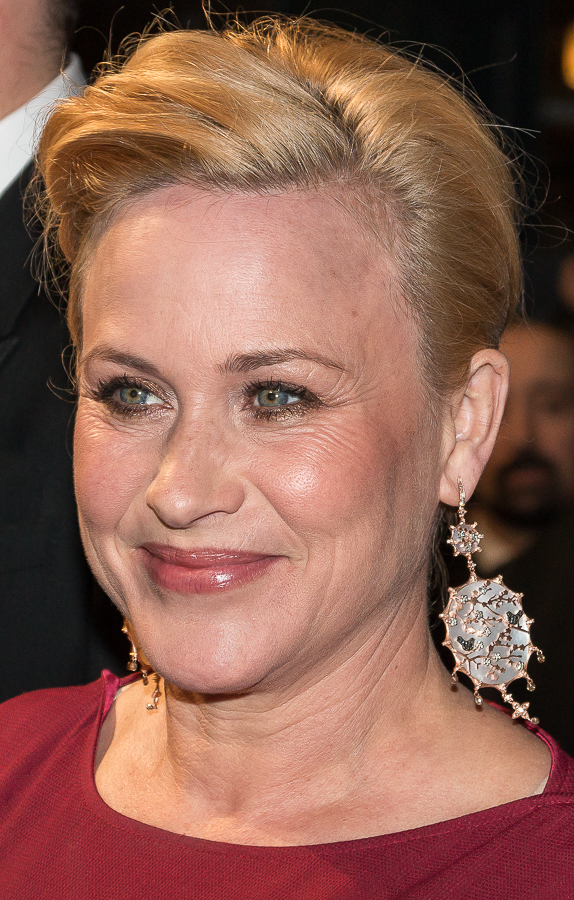
Dream Warriors was Patricia Arquette's first film.

Kristen Parker is one of the last Elm Street children who have nightmares. After falling asleep she is attacked by Freddy, who slits her wrists. Her injuries are seen as a suicide attempt; Kristen is admitted to Westin Hills Hospital, where she meets other children who are having similar nightmares. After meeting Nancy Thompson (the original Freddy survivor), she learns to control an ability which allows her to summon other people into her dreams and learns Freddy's motives. Calling Kincaid, Joey, Taryn, Will and Nancy to help, they defeat Freddy but lose Will, Nancy and Taryn in the process.

In A Nightmare on Elm Street 4 Kristen is a false protagonist similar to Nancy's deceased friend, Tina. She is released from Westin Hills, returning to school and a normal life with a new group of friends including Kincaid and Joey. Her poor relationship with her mother worsens when Kristen learns about her participation in Fred Krueger's murder from Nancy and discovers her motive: sadism. Freddy returns, killing Kincaid and Joey. After Freddy attacks Kristen in her dreams, she unwittingly pulls her friend Alice Johnson into her dream. Trying to protect Alice, Kristen is killed by Freddy (who pushes her into the boiler room and burns her to death). She passes her ability to Alice and (unintentionally) Freddy, beginning a chain of events which turns them into enemies.

According to Nightmare on Elm Street 4 producer Rachel Talalay, Arquette was not approached by New Line to reprise her role. Knight made a cameo appearance as a fictitious version of herself in Wes Craven's New Nightmare.

=== Jennifer Caulfield ===
- Played by Penelope Sudrow
- Appeared in: A Nightmare on Elm Street 3

Jennifer Caulfield is a teenaged patient at Westin Hills Hospital who refuses to sleep after experiencing horrific dreams and self-harms to stay awake. An aspiring TV star, she watches shows to learn techniques but inadvertently falls asleep. Unaware that she is dreaming, she approaches the wall-mounted TV in the hospital when it displays strange images. The TV sprouts arms and Freddy's head; the arms restrain and lift her, slamming her head into the TV screen and electrocuting her.

=== Joey Crusel ===
- Played by Rodney Eastman
- Appeared in A Nightmare on Elm Street 3 and A Nightmare on Elm Street 4

Joseph "Joey" Crusel is a mute patient at Westin Hills and also the youngest, who refuses to speak or sleep after experiencing nightmares. After he falls asleep Joey is seduced by an attractive nurse who, after restraining him supposedly for sex, reveals herself as Freddy Krueger. Krueger holds him hostage in the dream world to lure Nancy and the other teenagers at the hospital. Joey is later freed by Nancy and Kincaid before discovering that his dream power was a powerful, deafening voice which he uses to save them from Freddy's attack. In A Nightmare on Elm Street 4, Joey leaves Westin Hills and begins a normal life with Kristen and Kincaid; however, Freddy returns and kills him by drowning and stabbing him in his waterbed.

=== Max Daniels ===
- Played by Laurence Fishburne
- Appeared in A Nightmare on Elm Street 3

Max Daniels is an orderly at Westin Hills Hospital who is responsible for helping look after and secure the young patients suffering from nightmares. Although he follows orders, Max cares about his patients' well-being and pretends not to see Jennifer watching TV past her curfew after she begs to be allowed to stay awake.

=== Neil Gordon ===
- Played by Craig Wasson
- Appeared in A Nightmare on Elm Street 3 and Freddy vs. Jason vs. Ash: The Nightmare Warriors

Dr. Neil Gordon is trying to treat the young at Westin Hills for their refusal to sleep and nightmares. After meeting Nancy Thompson, he begins to believe that their dreams may be more than a group delusion. Neil and Don (Nancy's father) search for Freddy's remains to lay him to rest; Freddy's bones revive when they are uncovered, attacking Neil and Don and killing Don. After the bones return to their grave, Dr. Gordon regains consciousness and performs last rites for them (apparently defeating Freddy).

In literature, Gordon appears in the 1991 short story collection The Nightmares on Elm Street: Freddy Krueger's Seven Sweetest Dreams. In the story "Le Morte De Freddy", Dr. Andy Curtis of Springwood Mental Health Center is struggling to treat several adolescent patients who are being terrorized by Freddy Krueger. He is encouraged to study the archived files of Westin Hills (which had closed five years prior to the story's events) and Dr. Neil Gordon's research. The death of his patient Gayle Ann Millikin forces Dr. Curtis to visit Gordon at a psychiatric study institute in Gainesville, Florida. However, Dr. Gordon is actually a patient (with certain phone privileges due to his medical background) being treated for a sleep disorder—as he is the only known adult to be terrorized by Krueger. Dr. Gordon recounts the events of Dream Warriors and Krueger's perverse background to Dr. Curtis. In Gainesville, Neil learned via a letter sent from Alice Johnson that Kristen Parker, Roland Kincaid and Joey Crusel were murdered by Krueger, but that Alice herself took care of him. Knowing that Alice was ultimately wrong, Dr. Gordon and Dr. Curtis return to Springwood, Ohio, and embark on a time travel mission to trick Krueger into eliminating his past self.

Neil returned in Nightmares on Elm Street, a canonical six-issue comic book series published by Innovation Comics from 1991 to 1992. In the series, he joins forces with Nancy Thompson, Jacob Johnson and Alice Johnson to fight Freddy in his nightmare world. Neil appears in the comic series Freddy vs. Jason vs. Ash: The Nightmare Warriors as the co-founder (with Maggie Burroughs) of a support group for survivors of Freddy and Jason's massacres. After Freddy and Jason launch an attack on Washington, D.C., Gordon and Nancy's spirit use the Necronomicon to cast Freddy into hell. In the comic, he still struggles to recover from Nancy's death.

=== Phillip "The Walker" Anderson ===
- Played by Bradley Gregg
- Appeared in A Nightmare on Elm Street 3

Phillip Anderson is a patient at Westin Hills who is experiencing nightmares which make him afraid to sleep. He is quick to connect the dots between his dreams and those of his fellow Westin Hills patients, who see him as a leader. Phillip sleepwalks and Freddy, eager to demoralize the group by eliminating its leader, attacks Phillip in a dream by slicing open his skin, pulling out his tendons and using them like puppet strings to manipulate his movements. Freddy leads Phillip to a high ledge in a tower and severs the tendon-strings, allowing him to fall to his death.

=== Roland Kincaid ===
- Played by Ken Sagoes
- Appeared in A Nightmare on Elm Street 3 and A Nightmare on Elm Street 4

Roland Kincaid is a patient at Westin Hills Hospital who is admitted due to his refusal to sleep after a series of nightmares. Roland is aggressive and resistant to being sedated, often kept in solitary confinement and singing songs to stay awake. He and the other young people at the hospital are pulled into the dream world by Kristen Parker to help defeat Freddy and free Joey, who is being held hostage. In the dream world, he has superhuman strength which he uses to help the group overcome obstacles and defeat Freddy.

In A Nightmare on Elm Street 4, Roland leaves the hospital after the nightmares end and tries to get on with his life. Freddy returns, however, capturing him in a dream and murdering him.

Roland is mentioned in the second issue of the prequel comic A Nightmare on Elm Street the Beginning, with his mother being terrified that Freddy will kill him after being released, causing his parents to join the mob that kills Freddy. Story notes for the final issue (which was never written due to the comic company's bankruptcy) intended for Mrs. Kincaid to be killed by Freddy prior to his decision to start targeting the Elm Street children.

=== Taryn White ===
- Played by Jennifer Rubin
- Appeared in A Nightmare on Elm Street 3

Taryn White is a fellow patient at Westin Hills Hospital. She has a history of drug abuse, and is sexually harassed by a male orderly. Taryn goes into her dreams with the other sleep-deprived patients and Nancy Thompson to try to defeat Freddy, who is holding Joey hostage. In her dreams she transforms into a punk beauty and gains the ability to fight with a pair of sliding knives, which she uses to try to defeat Freddy. Freddy subdues her, transforms the blades on his glove into syringes and injects Taryn with a drug overdose, killing her.

=== Will Stanton ===
- Played by Ira Heiden
- Appeared in A Nightmare on Elm Street 3

Will Stanton, a fellow patient at Westin Hills Hospital and a fan of Dungeons & Dragons-style games, is paralyzed from the waist down after a suicide attempt to escape his nightmares. When Freddy captures Joey in his dreams, Will joins the other patients and Nancy Thompson in the dream world to fight him. Although he can walk and make magical attacks in his dreams, Freddy catches and kills him.

== A Nightmare on Elm Street 4: The Dream Master ==
=== Alice Johnson ===
- Played by Lisa Wilcox
- Appeared in A Nightmare on Elm Street 4, A Nightmare on Elm Street 5, Nightmares on Elm Street, The Nightmares on Elm Street: Freddy Krueger's Seven Sweetest Dreams ("Dead Highway, Lost Roads") and Freddy vs. Jason vs. Ash: The Nightmare Warriors

Alice is a friend of Kristen Parker, the last Elm Street child. Freddy Krueger requires her to bring him more children, eventually tormenting her enough to summon Alice. Kristen is killed by Freddy after she gives Alice (and Freddy) the ability to summon others into her dreams; freddy then begins summoning Alice's friends to him in their dreams to kill them. When he does, their dream powers and personality traits are absorbed by Alice (making her stronger and revealing her as the Dream Master, Freddy's opposite). Alice confronts Freddy with her new abilities, but cannot defeat him. She then recites a rhyme her mother taught her about the Dream Master, which allows her to gain control of her dream; using a piece of broken glass, she forces Freddy to see himself. Alice opens the positive dream gate, allowing Freddy's captured souls to escape and destroying him.

In The Dream Child, Alice is dating Dan Jordan and becomes pregnant with his child. Freddy returns, using her unborn son Jacob's dreams to murder people (including Dan) and feeding Jacob the souls of his victims to make him more like himself. Alice defeats Freddy with the help of the spirit of Amanda Krueger and Jacob. She later gives birth to Jacob and moves away from Springwood; in the original script for Freddy's Dead: The Final Nightmare, Alice was to be killed by Freddy early in the film.

In Nightmares on Elm Street, a six-issue miniseries published by Innovation Comics, Alice returns to Springwood after her father's death and is forced to face Freddy after he tries to use the pre-pubescent Jacob to kill. In the anthology The Nightmares on Elm Street: Freddy Krueger's Seven Sweetest Dreams (1991), Alice appears in Philip Nutman's "Dead Highway, Lost Roads". After being involved in a major accident, Alice becomes ensnared in the dream world by Freddy Krueger in a macabre "Alice in Wonderland" setting. With the aid of serial killer Karl Stolenberg and anthropomorphic armadillo Joe Bob, Jacob eventually finds his mother. A deranged Karl attacks Alice, but Jacob returns him to his senses by force. Alice and Karl cooperate to defeat Freddy, although Karl dies in the battle. With Freddy defeated, Alice and Jacob return to the waking world. She also appears in Freddy vs. Jason vs. Ash: Nightmare Warriors, where a vision of Freddy causes her to meet other Freddy and Jason survivors. She reveals that her dream powers have caused a terminal illness and sacrifices herself to pass her powers to her son, the main protagonist in Natasha Rhodes' novel A Nightmare on Elm Street: Perchance to Dream.

In his book Horror Films of the 1980s, John Kenneth Muir writes:

Alice's blossoming is coupled with the mirror (an important symbol in the film). When she is weak and diffident, the mirror is loaded with photographs that obscure her reflection. The message is that she doesn't want to see herself; she'd rather hide from what she considers ugly. But as Alice's strength grows, she takes down the photos and countenances her own image. What she finds there is gorgeous and strong.

Muir believes that Alice's transformation "is the perfect counterpoint to Freddy's storyline"; Freddy's reflection encompasses evil, but Alice's "reflection is what makes her powerful". According to Muir, Alice contradicts the "final girl" stereotype; she is a "greasy-haired ugly duckling [who finds] her inner strength and beauty through self-actualization". "From Nancy to Alice, the women on Elm Street are tough, resourceful, powerful role models for teenagers, ones who mirror reality in their efforts to navigate high school and, indeed, life". Muir concludes, "[Alice is] afraid of what her child will be; she wants to protect it; and she has to fend off Dan's parents, who want to adopt the child ... [she must deal] with all of these competing emotions and stresses, not to mention Freddy ..."

In an interview, Lisa Wilcox noted her similarity to Alice:

I immediately fell in love with the story of Alice. She's a daydreamer who was kind of pathetic at the beginning of Part Four, and I think we all can relate to that feeling in some ways. Actually, I was totally a wallflower in high school so there was a lot of myself in the character of Alice. There's a lot of Lisa on that screen ... As an actress, though, what made Alice remarkable is that audiences watch Alice become stronger and stronger as the movie plays along, and you can't help but be a part of her journey because she's so relatable.

=== Dan Jordan ===
- Played by Danny Hassel
- Appeared in A Nightmare on Elm Street 4 and A Nightmare on Elm Street 5

Daniel "Dan" Jordan is a Springwood teenager. A star football player, his friendship with Rick Johnson introduces him to Alice (who has a crush on him). Dan joins Alice to help defeat Freddy Krueger, and Alice saves his life. In A Nightmare on Elm Street 5, Dan and Alice begin a romantic relationship and Alice becomes pregnant with their son, Jacob. After Freddy returns (using the unborn Jacob's dreams), Dan falls asleep while driving and Freddy kills him; Dan dreams that he is driving a motorcycle, and Freddy (appearing in a mechanized version of himself) murders him by shoving bike cables up Dan's arms, legs and skull. Freddy then tears away Dan's flesh by pumping Dan full of gasoline and transforming Dan into a biomechanical monster. When Dan wakes up, he crashes into a truck; his pickup explodes, killing him instantly. Dan never learns that Alice was pregnant with his son.

In the Nightmares on Elm Street comic series, Dan is resurrected in Neil Gordon's comatose body after Jacob again defeats Freddy.

=== Debbie Stevens ===
- Played by Brooke Theiss
- Appeared in A Nightmare on Elm Street 4

Debbie, the last of Alice Johnson's friends after the others are killed by Freddy Krueger, has a deep-rooted fear of insects. Knowing that Debbie will be Freddy's next target, Alice tries to save her; however, Freddy traps Alice and love interest Dan in a time loop without their knowledge. By the time Alice and Dan can escape, they are too late to reach Debbie before Freddy attacks her; he kills Debbie by painfully transforming her into a cockroach, trapping her in a Roach Motel and crushing her.

=== Rick Johnson ===
- Played by Andras Jones
- Appeared in A Nightmare on Elm Street 4; mentioned in A Nightmare on Elm Street 5

Rick is Alice Johnson's twin brother, Dan Jordan's friend and Kristen Parker's boyfriend. He has a great interest in Japanese martial arts, in which he is self-taught. After Freddy kills Kristen, Rick still refuses to believe that he is real. He falls asleep, and is killed by Freddy in a dojo dream-world scene.

=== Sheila Kopecky ===
- Played by Toy Newkirk
- Appeared in A Nightmare on Elm Street 4

Sheila is a friend of Alice Johnson. Intelligent and a bit nerdy, she is also good friends with Debbie Stevens (who defends her from the boys); her motto is "mind over matter". When Alice falls asleep in school, she unintentionally pulls Sheila into her dream and Freddy attacks her; he sucks all the air from her body, causing a fatal real-world asthma attack.

== A Nightmare on Elm Street 5: The Dream Child ==
=== Jacob Johnson ===
- Played by Whit Hertford
- Appeared in A Nightmare on Elm Street 5, Nightmares on Elm Street, The Nightmares on Elm Street: Freddy Krueger's Seven Sweetest Dreams ("Dead Highway, Lost Roads"), A Nightmare on Elm Street: Perchance to Dream and Freddy vs. Jason vs. Ash: The Nightmare Warriors

Jacob is the son of Alice Johnson and Dan Jordan. After being defeated by his mother in A Nightmare on Elm Street 4, Freddy Krueger returns in Jacob's dreams before he is born and feeds him the souls of his victims. The spirit of Jacob as a young boy appears to his mother, although she is initially unaware of his identity. When she is freed by Yvonne, Amanda Krueger's soul tells Jacob's spirit to use the power which Freddy gave him. After releasing the power, Jacob forces Freddy to revert to an infant form (which is absorbed by Amanda); several months later, Jacob is born. In the original script for Freddy's Dead: The Final Nightmare, Alice is killed by Freddy Krueger and Jacob is the main protagonist.

In the 1991 anthology The Nightmares on Elm Street: Freddy Krueger's Seven Sweetest Dreams, Jacob (a young boy with heterochromia) is the protagonist in Philip Nutman's "Dead Highway, Lost Roads." After Alice is involved in a serious accident, Jacob enters the dream world in search of his mother. He befriends Joe Bob (an anthropomorphic armadillo) and serial killer Karl Stolenberg, who was en route to his execution before the accident. They eventually find Alice ensnared in a strange version of the Mad Hatter's tea party in Alice's Adventures in Wonderland. Joe Bob is disemboweled by Freddy, and Karl attacks Alice in a psychotic rage; Jacob hits Karl in the back of the head to return him to his senses. Alice and Karl defeat Freddy, and Karl is killed; Jacob and his mother return to the real world.

In Natasha Rhodes' novel, A Nightmare on Elm Street: Perchance to Dream (published by Black Flame), a now teenaged Jacob Johnson is a Westin Hills patient. The book mentions that he was raised by his grandmother Doris Jordan after she stole custody from Alice. Jacob was eventually placed with foster parents, whom he killed by accident after hallucinating that they were Freddy. Jacob was institutionalized as a result and Alice went missing. To protect everyone from Freddy, Jacob has stopped himself and others from dreaming for a month by using his dream powers; however, this makes the residents violent and paranoid. It is revealed that anyone who is aware of Freddy's existence is quarantined in the institution. Upon escaping Westin Hills, Jacob sees visions of Alice at certain points of the novel, and one shows his mother suffering voicelessly in the dream world (supposedly killed by Freddy, though it is not clarified whether it is truly her or just an apparition conjured up by Freddy to torment Jacob). There is no doubt that his father Dan is dead, and Jacob's need for a father figure makes him susceptible to his mentor and caseworker Jack Kane's manipulation—as Kane aims to steal Freddy's powers in order to make up for his own feelings of rejection and powerlessness. Most likely in reference to the events of The Dream Child, Freddy also perversely considers himself a father to Jacob.

Jacob's future is explored in the first story arc of Innovation Publishing's Nightmares on Elm Street comic series. He returns to Springwood with his mother at age six when his grandfather dies. Freddy tries to manipulate Jacob to help him enter the real world with the promise to resurrect his father, Dan. Jacob learns about Freddy's plans, and defeats him with help from Alice, Neil Gordon and the spirits of Dan and Nancy Thompson. He and Alice reunite with Dan, who returns to life in Neil Gordon's comatose body. Jacob later appears in the crossover Freddy vs. Jason vs. Ash: The Nightmare Warriors, where he is kidnapped by Freddy to lure Alice. Alice (who is terminally ill) allows Freddy to kill her so she can pass her powers to her son, who summons the spirits of Freddy's victims to fight him.

=== Greta Gibson ===
- Played by Erika Anderson
- Appeared in A Nightmare on Elm Street 5

Greta, a friend of Alice Johnson and daughter of the overbearing Racine, wants to be a supermodel. At a party in her honor hosted by her mother, she falls asleep at the table. Freddy binds Greta to his chair and opens a doll with his claws, opening Greta's abdomen. He then locks her in a refrigerator, killing her in the dream world; in the real world she is apparently choking, but none of the party guests help her.

=== Mark Gray ===
- Played by Joe Seely
- Appeared in: A Nightmare on Elm Street 5

Mark is a friend of Alice Johnson. Obsessed with comic books, he is a talented comic-book artist, knowledgeable about mythology and in love with Greta. Although Mark does not believe Alice's story about Freddy Krueger at first, he begins to take her seriously after Freddy kills Greta. He is later attacked by Freddy, but is saved by Alice and awakens before Freddy can kill him. Alice asks Mark to research Freddy and Amanda Krueger's lives and deaths and, with his understanding of Christian theology, he speculates about what really happened to Amanda. Mark later watches over Alice while she looks for Amanda in her dreams. He falls asleep without realizing it, which allows Freddy to attack him again. In his comic-book world Mark takes the form of the Phantom Prowler, his superhero creation; Freddy attacks him as Super-Freddy, turning him into paper and slicing him to pieces.

=== Yvonne Miller ===
- Played by Kelly Jo Minter
- Appeared in A Nightmare on Elm Street 5 and Nightmares on Elm Street

Yvonne Miller, a friend of Alice, does not believe Alice's story about Freddy Krueger and thinks her paranoid behavior is the result of Dan's death until she is attacked by Freddy and saved by Alice. Alice sends Yvonne to now-abandoned Westin Hills Hospital to find Amanda Krueger's remains and free her spirit, allowing her to fight her son Freddy. Yvonne reappears in Innovation Comics' Nightmares on Elm Street as a police officer and repays her debt by saving Alice's life when Devonne, a woman sent by Freddy, tries to kill Alice with a machine gun and Yvonne shoots her. Alice then invites Yvonne to join her and Jacob, leaving Springwood to deprive Freddy of the opportunity to murder her.

== Freddy's Dead: The Final Nightmare ==
=== Carlos Rodriguez ===
- Played by Ricky Dean Logan
- Appeared in Freddy's Dead: The Final Nightmare

Carlos Rodriguez is a youth counseled by Maggie Burroughs who was physically abused by his parents, leaving with him a hearing disability. When Maggie and John Doe travel to Springwood, Carlos stows away in their van with Spencer and Tracy. After they are discovered by Maggie, they rest at a nearby house. Carlos and Spencer fall asleep, allowing Freddy to kill Carlos by magnifying his hearing aid and scratching a chalkboard (making his head explode).

=== Doc ===
- Played by Yaphet Kotto
- Appeared in Freddy's Dead: The Final Nightmare

Doc, a counselor at Maggie Burroughs' shelter, is a dream counselor and often uses that therapy to help Tracy. He can control his own dreams, allowing him to remember John Doe, Spencer and Carlos after their deaths although everyone else (except Maggie and Tracy) forgets them. Doc discovers that the only way to kill Freddy is to bring him into the real world after pulling a piece of his sweater during a confrontation. He tells Maggie, and helps her defeat Freddy by giving her 3D glasses.

=== Dream Demons ===
- Appeared in Freddy's Dead: The Final Nightmare

The Dream Demons are three serpentine entities which are revealed as the source of Freddy Krueger's power and ability to kill in dreams. After the human Freddy is killed by a vigilante mob, the demons appear to him with an offer to become their agent in exchange for power and immortality. Freddy accepts the offer and the demons merge with him, giving him his powers. After his daughter Maggie Burroughs pulls Freddy into the real world and destroys him with a pipe bomb, the demons abandon his body and disappear.

=== John Doe ===
- Played by Shon Greenblatt
- Appeared in Freddy's Dead: The Final Nightmare

John Doe is the last surviving child in Springwood after Freddy kills the others. When John is attacked by Freddy he is knocked beyond the Springwood limits, hits his head on a rock and develops amnesia. Since he is outside the town limits, Freddy cannot follow and kill him. John is picked up by the police and brought to Maggie Burroughs' shelter, where Maggie finds a Springwood newspaper clipping about Freddy's wife's disappearance in his pocket. Brought back to the town to discover his identity, he learns that Freddy had a child (which Doe believes is himself, because he has not been harmed). After John enters the dream world to try to help the trapped Spencer, Freddy tells him that his child was a girl and impales him on bed spikes; John transfers the information to Maggie before he dies.

=== Loretta Krueger ===
- Played by Lindsey Fields
- Appeared in Freddy's Dead: The Final Nightmare

Loretta is Freddy's wife and the mother of Katherine Krueger/Maggie Burroughs. She meets Freddy in high school and they marry in 1960, when they are still teenagers; their daughter, Katherine, is born in 1961. Although Loretta and Freddy love each other and Katherine and he tries to lead a normal life, Freddy's murderous nature overcomes him. Loretta finds evidence of Freddy's child killings; although she promises to remain silent, Freddy strangles her in front of five-year-old Katherine.

=== Maggie Burroughs ===
- Played by Lisa Zane (adult), Cassandra Rachel Freil (child)
- Appeared in Freddy's Dead: The Final Nightmare, A Nightmare on Elm Street: The Beginning and Freddy vs. Jason vs. Ash: The Nightmare Warriors

Margaret "Maggie" Burroughs (born Katherine Krueger) counsels troubled teenagers. For some time, she has had recurring nightmares of a water tower and a little girl with an unknown man and woman. Maggie meets John Doe, and is surprised to learn that he dreams about the same place and the same little girl. When she finds a newspaper clipping about Springwood, she brings him there to help him regain his memory. In Springwood, it is learned that Freddy has a child; although John assumes that it is himself, Freddy tells him (before killing him) that his child was a girl. Putting this and the dreams of a little girl together, Maggie searches her home and finds an adoption certificate which reveals she is Freddy's daughter; the dreams are repressed memories.

When she was a child, a number of children disappear from her neighborhood and are later found dead. Her mother, Loretta, finds Freddy's hidden room with his blade gloves and other evidence of the killings before Freddy kills her in front of Katherine. The police find the murderer; Freddy is arrested, and Katherine is placed in the Springwood orphanage. The young, traumatized Katherine "forgets" her life with her parents. Renamed Maggie, she is offered for adoption and moved to another town; her records are sealed to hide her identity.

When Maggie regains her early memories and learns about what Freddy has done, it becomes clear that he intends to kill her too. She stops her father by pulling him into the real world from her dream, disarming him with weapons and stabbing him in the abdomen with his glove. Maggie then shoves a pipe bomb into his chest; it explodes, killing him and releasing the Dream Demons.

She is the main protagonist in the unfinished storyline, A Nightmare on Elm Street: The Beginning - Dark Genesis, an epilogue of Freddy's Dead and a prequel of the film series. Maggie begins having nightmares after Freddy's supposed death in which she is Freddy, seeing his life from his perspective and becoming fearful that Freddy might return by subverting her from within. Although the storyline was not finished (Innovation Publishing went bankrupt), two of the storyline's four issues were published.

In Freddy vs. Jason vs. Ash: The Nightmare Warriors, Maggie and Neil Gordon found a support group with and for the surviving victims of Freddy and Jason. When the U.S. government resurrects Freddy to learn how to use the Necronomicon, she reveals herself as Freddy's daughter and joins him with a pair of bladed gloves. Maggie is killed by a falling tank driven by Ash, angering Freddy.

=== Mr. Edward Underwood ===
- Played by Alice Cooper
- Appeared in Freddy's Dead: The Final Nightmare

The alcoholic Edward Underwood is Freddy's physically and mentally abusive foster father, who adopts Freddy shortly after his birth. He is Freddy's first murder victim; the teenaged Freddy stabs him with a razor as Underwood beats him with a belt.

=== Spencer Lewis ===
- Played by Breckin Meyer
- Appeared in Freddy's Dead: The Final Nightmare

Spencer Lewis, a youth counseled by Maggie Burroughs, is sent to her shelter because his father's expectations have driven him to marijuana. He is fascinated with video games. When Maggie and John Doe go to Springwood, Spencer stows away in their van with Carlos and Tracy. After they are found, they rest in a nearby house; Carlos and Spencer fall asleep. Under the influence of drugs, Spencer is animated into a video game by Freddy and thrown to his death in a crater (witnessed by Maggie).

=== Tracy Swan ===
- Played by Lezlie Deane
- Appeared in Freddy's Dead: The Final Nightmare

Tracy Swan is a youth, also counseled by Maggie Burroughs, who was sexually abused by her father. When Maggie and John Doe go to Springwood, Tracy stows away in their van with Carlos and Spencer. Spencer and Carlos fall asleep, and Tracy goes into their dreams with John to try to help them; however, Spencer, Carlos and John are killed. Tracy and Maggie return to the shelter to find that no one remembers Spencer, Carlos or John. Tracy helps Maggie kill Freddy, giving her the pipe bomb she uses to destroy him.

== Wes Craven's New Nightmare ==
=== Chase Porter ===
- Played by David Newsom
- Appeared in Wes Craven's New Nightmare

Chase, father of Dylan Porter and fictional husband of Heather Langenkamp, is based on Langenkamp's husband David LeRoy Anderson in occupation. A film special-effects worker, he does not tell Nancy that his latest project is a new Nightmare on Elm Street film; instead, he lies to her that he was working on visual effects a television soap-company commercial. After Heather's nightmare (which leaves his fingers wounded as they were in her dream), she does now want him to leave for his latest project. Heather later calls him, saying that she is again getting harassing phone calls and Dylan cannot sleep, and he rushes home. He falls asleep en route; Freddy's claw slashes his abdomen, causing an accident which kills him. When Nancy is asked to view his body, she notices the claw marks on his chest. Dylan descends further into psychosis and Nancy becomes increasingly paranoid after his death.

=== Dylan Porter ===
- Played by Miko Hughes
- Appeared in Wes Craven's New Nightmare

Dylan, the fictional son of Heather Langenkamp (based on her real-life son, Daniel Atticus Anderson), is fascinated with dinosaurs and loves the Brothers Grimm fairy tale "Hansel and Gretel". He begins having strange dreams and commits involuntary acts relating to his mother's A Nightmare on Elm Street films, although she forbids him to watch them. The acts became more severe and Dylan is brought to the hospital, where doctors believe that his mother is abusing him. Before his mother's awareness of Freddy's attacks, Dylan's only defense against him Rex: his beloved stuffed tyrannosaurus, which comes alive in his dreams to protect him from nightmares and bogeymen. Freddy kills Rex and Dylan's babysitter, Julie, in dreams. He later abducts Dylan to his own realm, forcing Heather to follow. Dylan and his mother trap Freddy in a furnace, destroying him.

=== Heather Langenkamp ===
- Played by Heather Langenkamp
- Appeared in Wes Craven's New Nightmare

Heather, a fictionalized version of the real Heather Langenkamp, has left the A Nightmare on Elm Street films for a quiet life with her family. When work starts on a new Nightmare film, Heather begins having prophetic nightmares about murders and being stalked by Freddy Krueger. She is uncomfortable when her co-star, Robert Englund (who played Freddy), is nearby. Her husband is killed under strange circumstances and her son Dylan begins acting oddly, concerning her about his safety. After discussions with Englund and Wes Craven, Nancy learns that Freddy is an entity who has appeared in various forms through storytelling and is captive in the fictitious world of the Nightmare on Elm Street film series. The entity, trying to escape, sees her as an obstacle because she defeated Freddy (as Nancy) in two films. Although Nancy Thompson defeated Freddy in the films, Craven says that Heather gave her character the strength and Heather now needs it for her own battle with Freddy. Freddy captures Dylan to lure her into his realm, and Nancy uses sleeping pills to travel there. She and Dylan trap Freddy in a furnace and burn him alive, sending them back to the real world which slowly returns to normal.

=== Julie ===
- Played by Tracy Middendorf
- Appeared in Wes Craven's New Nightmare

Julie, Dylan's babysitter and Heather's friend, is very protective of the boy. She tells Heather that she has been having nightmares about Dylan being tormented by someone sinister, and Heather realizes that Freddy also haunts Julie's dreams and is targeting her. Julie watches over Dylan in the hospital when his mother is taken away. Freddy attacks her in the real world, murdering her in a manner similar to Tina Gray in the original film, and Dylan runs away.

=== Robert Englund ===
- Played by Robert Englund
- Appeared in Wes Craven's New Nightmare

Englund is a fictionalized version of Robert Englund, who plays Freddy Krueger in the Nightmare on Elm Street films. He supports Heather when she begins to experience strange events related to the Nightmare films, and says that he was also experiencing strange events and nightmares. Fearing for his safety, he leaves home shortly after talking to Heather on the phone. Englund is also an artist in the film, and the supernatural events compel him to paint a nightmarish portrait of Freddy Krueger (actually painted by Linda Newman) in his hall before leaving. He is horrified by the completed picture, since it is like seeing himself being Freddy Krueger in a mirror killing three men (Heather's husband Chase and his co-workers Chuck and Terry).

=== Wes Craven ===
- Played by Wes Craven
- Appeared in Wes Craven's New Nightmare

Craven is a fictionalized version of Wes Craven, creator of the Nightmare on Elm Street films, and is an oracle of the film's events. In the film, Heather says that Craven has moved on from making horror films to a series of successful films of other genres; however, his nightmares compelled him to make another entry in the Nightmare on Elm Street series. He provides information and support to Heather when she begins experiencing strange events related to the Nightmare films. Having prophetic nightmares every night, Craven hypothesizes that he captured a demon in his story of Freddy Krueger when he created the film series; the films are no longer being made and the demon is trying to escape through Nancy (the first person to defeat Freddy).

== Freddy vs. Jason ==
=== Bill Freeburg ===
- Played by Kyle Labine
- Appeared in Freddy vs. Jason

Bill Freeburg is a Springwood teenager who joins Lori Campbell and her friends to defeat Freddy Krueger and Jason Voorhees. They steal hypnocil (to keep them from dreaming) from Westin Hills Hospital, but Freddy possesses the stoned Bill and uses him to destroy the stock of hypnocil and inject Jason with a sedative. Bill, however, is killed by Jason before the sedative takes effect.

=== Charlie Linderman ===
- Played by Chris Marquette
- Appeared in Freddy vs. Jason

Charlie Linderman is a Springwood teenager who has an unrequited crush on Kia Waterson and joins her friends to defeat Freddy and Jason. After the group goes to Crystal Lake and brings Freddy into the real world to fight Jason, Charlie is fatally wounded and expresses his feelings for Kia before he dies.

=== Gibb Smith ===
- Played by Katharine Isabelle
- Appeared in Freddy vs. Jason

Gibb Smith is a Springwood teenager and a friend of Lori Campbell. She is in an emotionally abusive relationship with her boyfriend, Trey, who is later killed by Jason. At a rave, she passes out and is stalked by Freddy; before he can kill her, however, she is killed by Jason in the real world. Freddy then realizes he must act against Jason.

=== Jason Voorhees ===
- Played by Ken Kirzinger
- Appeared in Freddy vs. Jason, Freddy vs. Jason vs. Ash and Freddy vs. Jason vs. Ash: Nightmare Warriors

Jason Voorhees, an undead killer, stalks Camp Crystal Lake and is the antagonist of the Friday the 13th series. Unable to attack children in their dreams any more because he has been forgotten, Freddy manipulates Jason in the disguise of his mother to resurrect and begin murdering the teenagers of Elm Street with methods which would be attributed to Freddy (restoring his powers). Jason does not stop killing when Freddy regains his strength, however, forcing Freddy to act against him. They fight – first in the dream world (where Freddy uses Jason's childhood memories to defeat him), and then in the real world. Jason emerges from Crystal Lake at the end of the film with Freddy's severed head, the apparent winner; the head winks, however, indicating that Freddy is still alive.

=== Lori Campbell ===
- Played by Monica Keena
- Appeared in Freddy vs. Jason and Freddy vs. Jason vs. Ash

Lori Campbell is a Springwood teenager who begins having nightmares about Freddy Krueger after Jason murders her friend's boyfriend. Trying to defeat Freddy with Jason, Lori volunteers to enter the dream world and bring Freddy back to reality (where Jason can fight him). In a dream, she learns that Freddy murdered her mother years earlier. After Freddy nearly rapes her, Lori holds on to him when she is awakened (bringing him into the real world, where he fights Jason). While Jason and Freddy fight on a dock, Lori uses gasoline and propane to blow it up. Freddy survives the explosion and tries to kill Lori; however, Jason incapacitates him and Lori decapitates him. In the comic Freddy vs. Jason vs. Ash, set five years after the events of the movie, Will and Lori return to Crystal Lake to verify that Jason and Freddy are both still dead; Jason kills them both.

Keena praised her character's depth: "I think Lori's a very independent and tough character. She has an arc in the film because she learns that Freddy killed her mother and that inspires her to have a need to get revenge. She's the real hero of the story." Jeff Katz, who worked on the original screenplay for Freddy vs. Jason vs. Ash, said that Lori and Will's deaths were a way to continue the long-running tradition of Friday the 13th and Nightmare on Elm Street survivors being killed off in subsequent films. In an alternate ending of the film, Lori is killed when Will reveals himself as Freddy while they are having sex and stabs her; this scene also appears in the film's novelization. Lori is briefly mentioned in the novel A Nightmare on Elm Street: Suffer the Children.

=== Kia Waterson ===
- Played by Kelly Rowland
- Appeared in Freddy vs. Jason

Kia Waterson is a Springwood teenager and a friend of Lori Campbell. Although she is attracted to Charlie Linderman, she insults him. After a series of gruesome murders, Kia begins having nightmares about Freddy Krueger. She and her friends go to Camp Crystal Lake to force Jason and Freddy to fight. When Freddy is about to attack Lori, Kia distracts him with an insult and Jason kills her.

=== Mark Davis ===
- Played by Brendan Fletcher
- Appeared in Freddy vs. Jason

Mark Davis is a patient at Westin Hills Hospital who was admitted against his will due to his nightmares about Freddy Krueger to keep his knowledge of Freddy from the other Springwood teenagers. His older brother, Bobby, was also tormented by Freddy until he committed suicide. Mark provides Will Rollins, Lori Campbell and their friends with his knowledge of Freddy to help them survive, but fears that he ruined the town's plan to protect its children from fear. In the hospital, he is given hypnocil to keep him from dreaming. Mark begins dreaming after he escapes, however, allowing Freddy to murder him by setting his back on fire and leaving a message for Lori and Will on his back that he has returned.

=== Scott Stubbs ===
- Played by Lochlyn Munro
- Appeared in Freddy vs. Jason

Deputy Scott Stubbs, a Springwood police officer recently transferred to the town, has no knowledge of its history or Freddy Krueger. After a series of murders, he overhears the name "Freddy" and begins to suspect that his fellow officers know who is responsible. Scott suspects a Jason copycat, but the sheriff threatens to lock him up if he says anything. He joins Lori Campbell and her friends to stop Jason and Freddy from killing. They go to Westin Hills Hospital, which Jason attacks. He is electrocuted after accidentally stabbing a computer panel and grabs Scott, electrocuting the deputy.

=== Will Rollins ===
- Played by Jason Ritter
- Appeared in Freddy vs. Jason and Freddy vs. Jason vs. Ash

Will Rollins is a patient at Westin Hills and Lori Campbell's former boyfriend. After seeing what appears to be Lori's father murdering her mother (it is later learned that he was trying to save her from Freddy Krueger), he is involuntarily admitted to the hospital. When he sees news about a murder at Lori's house, Will escapes with Mark Davis and goes with Lori and her friends to Camp Crystal Lake to force Freddy and Jason to kill each other. He later helps Lori blow up the dock where the two were fighting. In the comic Freddy vs. Jason vs. Ash, set five years after the events of Freddy vs. Jason, Will and Lori return to Crystal Lake to ensure that Jason and Freddy are still gone; they are confronted by Jason, who kills them both.

== A Nightmare on Elm Street (2010) ==
=== Dean Russell ===
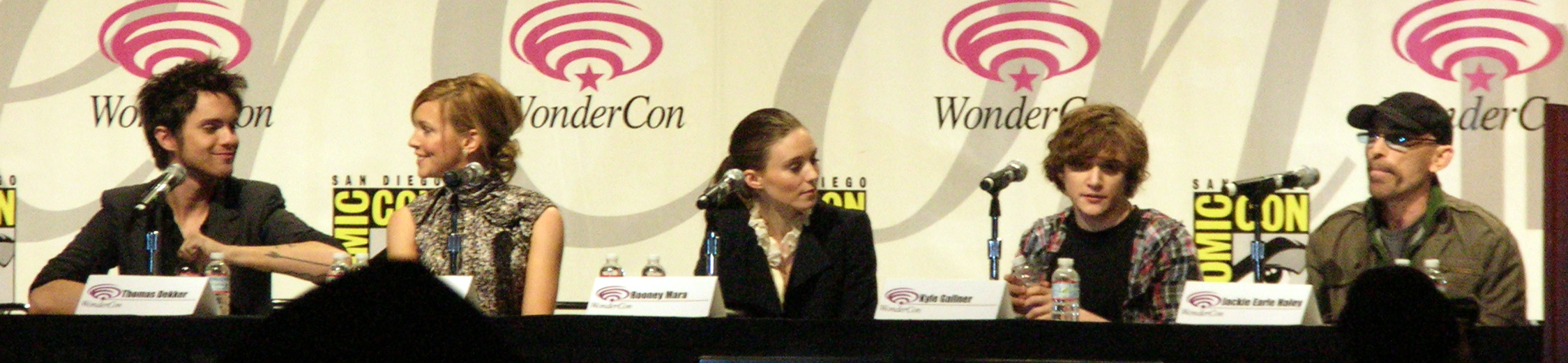
Cast members of A Nightmare on Elm Street (2010) at WonderCon 2010

- Played by Kellan Lutz
- Appeared in A Nightmare on Elm Street (2010)

Dean Russell is a teenager who is experiencing sleep deprivation and strange nightmares about an unknown man after exploring childhood memories with his psychiatrist. Since then, he struggles to stay awake and dependent of caffeine, and thus haven't been slept over 72 hours, resulting him become hypnagogic; he then dreams and hallucinates lucidly. He begins to fall asleep at the Springwood Diner when ordering coffee, allowing Freddy to cut his hand. Dean wakes up and grabs a knife to defend himself; as he falls asleep again, Freddy uses the knife in his dream to cut his throat.

=== Jesse Braun ===
- Played by Thomas Dekker
- Appeared in A Nightmare on Elm Street (2010)

Jesse Braun is a teenager who has nightmares about Freddy Krueger. When he talks with his friend Nancy and his ex-girlfriend Kris, he realizes that they share similar dreams; however, he refuses to admit his own experiences. After Kris' new boyfriend Dean is killed under strange circumstances, Jesse goes to her house and she asks him to stay awake and watch over her. Jesse falls asleep, however, and Freddy kills Kris. Suspected of murdering her, Jesse is arrested and jailed. After he falls asleep, Freddy pierces his heart and killing him.

In a deleted scene where Jesse's father (Christian Stolte) is killed by Freddy after his son's death, Freddy wants to kill the parents as well as their children. Jesse's story arc is similar to Rod Lane's in the original Nightmare on Elm Street.

=== Freddy Krueger (2010) ===
- Played by Jackie Earle Haley
- Appeared in A Nightmare on Elm Street (2010)

Freddy Krueger is a school gardener who sexually abuses children, particularly Nancy Holbrook (his favorite) and her friends. He brings them to a hidden location in the school, using his glove to scratch and cut them. When their parents learn about what Freddy has been doing, they hunt him down and burn him alive. After his death, he returns to stalk the children (now young adults) in their dreams before murdering them. When they begin to remember who Freddy is and what he did to them, they plan to bring Freddy into the real world and kill him. They pull him into the waking world, sever his gloved hand, slit his throat and set fire to the school building containing his remains. Although Freddy is believed dead, he breaks through a mirror and drags Nancy's mother Gwen into it.

Freddy's iconic glove is a modified gardener's glove. He is a playable guest character in Mortal Kombat and Dead by Daylight as downloadable content. In Mortal Kombat Freddy's voice resembles that of the original series, and he has two clawed gloves instead of one. In Dead by Daylight, Freddy's presence is indicated by survivors when children sing his nursery rhyme ("One, Two, Freddy's Coming for You") but he is unseen until he pulls a survivor into the dream world.

=== Kris Fowles ===
- Played by Katie Cassidy
- Appeared in A Nightmare on Elm Street (2010)

Kris Fowles, Nancy Holbrook's best friend, has nightmares about a burned man. After she sees her boyfriend Dean apparently commit suicide, she asks her ex-boyfriend Jesse to stay with her overnight and learns that he has been having the same dreams. Kris is killed by Freddy in her dreams, and suspicion falls on Jesse.

=== Nancy Holbrook ===
- Played by Rooney Mara
- Appeared in A Nightmare on Elm Street (2010)

Nancy Holbrook is a teenage waitress who sees her friend, Dean Russell, apparently kill himself in the diner where she works. She begins dreaming about a burned man and, during Dean's funeral, finds a photo of her and her friends as children (although she reportedly met them as a young adult). Nancy learns that all the other children in the photo have died, most in their sleep. Her mother tells her that she had known her friends in childhood, when they were sexually abused by gardener Freddy Krueger; the parents had joined and killed him. Nancy, with no memory of these events, blames her parents for killing Freddy without evidence and believes that he is now hunting her for revenge. Nancy and Quentin return to their preschool, and find Freddy's hidden room and evidence that he had sexually assaulted the children. She intentionally falls asleep to lure Freddy into the real world; he says that she has stayed awake so long that she will never be able to awaken on her own, and he will keep her there with him.

Quentin wakes Nancy with an adrenaline injection, bringing Freddy with her. She severs Freddy's hand with a broken paper-cutter blade, cuts his throat and sets fire to the room containing his remains. Although Nancy thinks that Freddy is defeated, he returns and drags her mother through a mirror.

=== Quentin Smith ===
- Played by Kyle Gallner
- Appeared in A Nightmare on Elm Street (2010) and Dead by Daylight (2017)

Nancy's friend Quentin Smith has nightmares which make him afraid to sleep, and their relationship slowly develops. They learn that they had known each other as children, but their memories of the time were suppressed. When Freddy attacks him, Quentin has a vision of their parents killing Freddy after they learned that he had been abusing the children. With no memory of being molested, he blames the parents for killing an innocent man who was now avenging the children for (supposedly) lying. Quentin and Nancy return to their preschool and discovers that Freddy had actually been abusing the children. Nancy captures Freddy in her dreams, and Quentin uses adrenaline to wake her when she shows signs of distress. She brings Freddy into the real world, and Quentin is seriously injured when he distracts Freddy so Nancy can kill him.

Quentin is a playable character (as downloadable content) in the survival horror video game, Dead by Daylight, a survivor who is bundled with the 2010 Freddy as a killer. According to his biography, his role in the game follows the events of the 2010 film.

== Freddy's Nightmares ==
=== Tim Blocker ===
- Played by Ian Patrick Williams
- Appeared in "No More Mr. Nice Guy"

Lieutenant Tim Blocker is the police officer who arrests Freddy Krueger after Freddy stalks Blocker's teenage twin daughters, Merit and Lisa, around his house. His wife's name is Sarah. After Freddy's trial ends in acquittal on a legal technicality, a lynch mob forms. Tim arrives to stop them, saying that killing Freddy would lower them all to his level. Freddy taunts Tim, boasting that he would get his twins sooner or later. Tim then douses Freddy with gasoline and sets him ablaze, to Freddy's delight. He begins having nightmares about Freddy, but minimizes their importance. Tim falls asleep in the dentist's office and has his final nightmare; Freddy is the dentist, with dental instruments instead of his finger knives, and says that his teeth "all have to go". The dental assistant cannot awaken him.

Tim also appears in the unfinished A Nightmare on Elm Street: The Beginning comics. In an attempt to bridge the film and television series, he is the police partner of Donald Thompson from the film series. After Freddy is released and threatens to get to Merit, Lisa and Nancy, Tim and Don join the lynch mob.

=== Merit and Lisa Blocker ===
- Played by Gry and Hili Park
- Appear in "No More Mr. Nice Guy" and "Sister's Keeper"

Merit and Lisa are Tim and Sarah's blonde, identical-twin daughters. They are the main characters of "Sister's Keeper", after their father's death in the series premiere.

Merit is the "nutcase sister" who thinks that Freddy is back, warning before his death: "If you kill Freddy, you'll only make it worse". She dreams about him, and believes that he murdered their father. When Freddy injures Merit in her dreams, Lisa has the cuts and bruises in real life and believes that her sister is causing them with her antics and paranoia.

Lisa is the "normal sister", the doubter, who believes that Merit is delusional and their father died because he could not live with the guilt of killing Freddy. She also begins having nightmares about Freddy, and acknowledges that Merit is not crazy. The sisters consult a school counselor for advice about defending themselves from Freddy. This is mirrored in an omitted scene from A Nightmare on Elm Street 4: The Dream Master, when Alice, Dan and Debbie ask their open-minded teacher Bryson for advice on stopping Freddy and he thinks they are paranoid. Merit and Lisa decide to fight Freddy together, sharing the same dream as that in Dream Warriors and Dream Master. They try to weaken Freddy by denying his existence, repeatedly shouting "You don't exist and you're gone!" Freddy murders Lisa, leaving Merit to try to explain what happened to their mother, who seems to suspect her of killing her sister.

== See also ==
- List of Friday the 13th characters
- List of Scream (film series)
- List of Halloween (franchise) characters
