= Freddy vs. Jason vs. Ash: The Nightmare Warriors =

Limited series comic book

- Cover illustration by Arthur Suydam

Publication information
- Publisher: DC Comics; Dynamite Entertainment
- Schedule: Monthly
- Format: Limited series
- Genre: Horror; Crossover
- Publication date: August – December 2009
- No. of issues: 6
- Main characters: Freddy Krueger; Jason Voorhees; Ash Williams; Maggie Burroughs; Neil Gordon; Stephanie Kimble; Steven Freeman; Alice Johnson; Jacob Johnson; Rennie Wickham; Tina Shepard; Tommy Jarvis; Nancy Thompson

Creative team
- Created by: Wes Craven; Victor Miller; Sam Raimi
- Written by: Jeff Katz; James Kuhoric
- Artist: Jason Craig
- Letterer: Wes Abbott
- Colorist: Gabe Eltaeb

Freddy vs. Jason vs. Ash: The Nightmare Warriors is a six-issue limited series comic book written by Jeff Katz and James Kuhoric, with drawings by Jason Craig. The series was published by Dynamite Entertainment and DC Comics, with imprint by Wildstorm, beginning in August 2009 and concluding in December 2009. The Nightmare Warriors is a sequel to Freddy vs. Jason vs. Ash, which was published in 2007 and was itself a sequel to the 2003 film Freddy vs. Jason. The series is a crossover between the A Nightmare on Elm Street, Friday the 13th, and Evil Dead horror film franchises. The comic is ignoring the events of Jason X (2001) and Ash vs Evil Dead (2015–2018).

The Nightmare Warriors sees Freddy Krueger and Jason Voorhees resurrected by the United States government, who wish to exploit their supernatural powers; however, the government is unable to control them, and the killers attempt to take over the world using the Necronomicon Ex-Mortis. Meanwhile, Ash Williams joins forces with the Nightmare Warriors, a support group for people who have survived encounters with Freddy and/or Jason, which consists of numerous established characters from the A Nightmare on Elm Street and Friday the 13th franchises, to defeat Freddy and Jason for good.

Katz and Kuhoric wrote the sequel as an epic "fanboy story", and modeled the concept after the Crisis events from DC Comics. The titular Nightmare Warriors were designed as a "Justice League"-style superhero team. The writers attempted to take the three separate mythologies and combine them into one coherent continuity.

== Plot ==
A group of government agents led by Director Gordon Russell excavate Crystal Lake for the Necronomicon Ex-Mortis, which they plan to use for "Project Black Book". As Russell leaves with the book, the remaining agents go underwater to retrieve the body of Jason Voorhees, who awakens and kills them. Prompted by Freddy Krueger posing as his mother, Jason leaves Crystal Lake in search of Ash Williams. Six months later, in June 2009, Ash is living in Franklin, Michigan with his girlfriend Caroline, believing his days of fighting monsters are behind him. While preparing to host a backyard barbecue, Ash is visited by Doctor Maggie Burroughs, who tries to convince him to join a group started by herself and Doctor Neil Gordon consisting of people who have fought and survived "unnatural evils". Annoyed by his visitor, Ash sends Maggie away before going to the store for supplies for the party, leaving Caroline alone. Elsewhere, Stephanie Kimble and Alice Johnson experience visions of Jason and Freddy, while Jason attacks and kills Caroline. Meanwhile, at the Pentagon, Russell reveals his plan to create an army of demonic soldiers using the Necronomicon.

After discovering Caroline's body, Ash flees the scene as the police arrive, not noticing a man in a hummer spying on him. At his headquarters, Russell uses a combination of modern technology and the Necronomicon to pull an unburnt and seemingly powerless Freddy Krueger out of the Deadites' realm to Earth. Ash boards a train to Baltimore, Maryland to look for Maggie and her group, and Jason follows him by stowing away in the vehicle's boxcar. Stephanie, her father Steven, Alice, and her son Jacob show up at Maggie and Neil's house, where Tina Shepard and Rennie Wickham are already living. When Ash arrives, Maggie gets everyone settled and begins to tell them about her and Neil's goals. They are interrupted by Jason, who comes crashing through the door and kills Steven. As Ash arms himself, the man in the hummer drives through the wall of the house and rams into Jason. Everyone escapes, and their savior introduces himself as Tommy Jarvis, Jason's oldest enemy.

Government agents show up at Maggie and Neil's house and take Jason down with bullets and missiles. Meanwhile, the survivors take refuge at a motel and Maggie suggests they visit her (adoptive?) father, Gordon Russell, to use the Necronomicon to defeat the killers. Unimpressed, Tommy breaks away from the group and goes solo. At the Capitol, Jason is put in a holding cell full of Deadites. He is visited mentally by Freddy, who proposes that they team up to massacre the world. Jason accepts when he hears that his old enemies — including Tommy — will be coming for them. Freddy appoints him the general of his Deadite army, repairs his decomposed body, and brings him back to life as before he was killed by Tommy. Meanwhile, the group (minus Stephanie and Jacob, who remain at the motel) also arrive at the Capitol and are locked up, with the exception of Maggie, Neil, and Rennie, who Russell takes to visit Freddy. Freddy transforms back into his burned, demonic form, and reveals that he has bonded with the Necronomicon and possesses all of its powers. Russell attacks Freddy with his own glove, but Maggie turns the blades back on him and kills him. She reveals her true identity as Freddy's daughter, Kathryn Krueger, and attacks Neil and Rennie. Tina feels the psychic impact of Rennie's death, and uses her telekinesis to break out of her cell. As she, Ash, and Alice escape, Jason and his army of Deadites descend on Washington.

Ash, Tina, and Alice fight and destroy a Freddy-controlled robot to acquire the Necronomicon. Meanwhile, Tommy confronts Jason on the streets of Washington as he and the Deadites cut a swath of destruction across the city. While opening fire on his nemesis, Tommy is attacked by winged Deadites, who take him to Freddy. Back at the motel, Jacob and Stephanie fall asleep, and Freddy possesses the latter. Stephanie/Freddy seduces and attacks Jacob, forcing him to call out to his mother. Alice hears her son's cries and uses her Dream Master powers to transport herself, Ash, and Tina into Jacob's nightmare. Immobilizing Ash during the fight, Freddy flays Stephanie alive and escapes with Jacob. Still in the dreamscape, Tina and Alice put Stephanie's skin back on and she wakes up physically unharmed. At the White House, Tommy and Jacob are held hostage by Freddy, Jason, and Maggie. Disguised as the President, Freddy addresses the nation, describing his new policy "no kid left alive" and the carnage he plans to cause all over the globe. Having seen Freddy's broadcast, Ash and the girls break into a nearby pawn shop for weaponry and head to the White House.

As it literally rains blood in Washington, Ash, Alice, Tina, and Stephanie plan their way into the White House. Upset by Ash and Alice's bickering, the traumatized Stephanie wanders off alone. The group are provided the distraction they need to get in when an army of soldiers arrive to rescue the President. Tanks, helicopters, and fighter jets battle the Deadites, but the soldiers suffer heavy losses and Freddy manifests in the clouds to blast the helicopters out of the sky. Elsewhere, Stephanie passes out and finds herself back in the dream world. She arrives at a church and meets Freddy posing as a priest; he informs her that, as member of the Voorhees family, it is her destiny to become a murderer like Jason. Clad in her own hockey mask, Stephanie leaves the church to fulfill her birthright and kill Jason. Back at the White House, Maggie and Jason break out in a fight, but are interrupted by Ash, who drives a tank in the middle of the room, killing Maggie, much to Freddy's anger. As Ash rescues Neil, Jacob, and Tommy, Alice confronts Freddy face-to-face. She reveals that she has a terminal illness and that her Dream Master abilities are weakened, so she allows Freddy to kill her so she can pass her power over to Jacob. As she dies, she releases the souls of the people Freddy has killed over the years. Furious at his mother's death, Jacob declares he is the Dream Master now, surrounded by the spirits of Amanda Krueger and the Dream Warriors.

Amanda and the other souls successfully destroy the Deadite army, but Freddy quickly severs their connection to Earth by critically wounding Jacob. As Tina tends to Jacob and Ash battles Freddy, Tommy takes it upon himself to deal with Jason. In a closely matched fight, he taunts Jason for never being able to kill him. Stephanie appears and impales her uncle with a machete; this distraction provides Tommy the opportunity to stab Jason's head with a shard of glass. However, Freddy exploits this victory by absorbing Jason's soul to increase his own power. As Neil struggles to read the Necronomicon's passages to banish Krueger, he is joined by the spirit of Nancy Thompson, Freddy's first enemy; together Neil and Nancy recite the words to open the Deadite's dimension. Freddy resists the vortex, until the Necronomicon itself declares him unworthy and strips him of his power. The human Freddy begs for forgiveness, claiming that the demonic power corrupted him. Thankfully, Ash doesn't believe him and mercilessly blasts Freddy into the vortex with his shotgun, citing his own lack of a 'storybook ending'; it is likely, upon Krueger's return to the Deadite dimension, that he dies at the hands of the Deadites. At the same time, Nancy leaves Neil to rejoin the other spirits. Around the same time, Jason's mask is shown (which Tommy split in half with a rock) with his mother's voice telling Jason that he can never die. The next morning, Ash decides to go on vacation in Texas and bids farewell to Tommy, Tina, Neil, Jacob, and Stephanie, appointing Tommy the new captain of the "Nightmare Warriors".

Later, it's shown that in 1964 Springwood, a time-displaced and disoriented Agent Wesley Carter - who had been sucked into the Necronomicon's vortex - finds himself in the Springwood Police Department on the day of Fred Krueger's arrest, and impulsively signs Krueger's search warrant when he finds the file on a desk in front of him, altering history so that the technicality that would have eventually rebirthed Krueger as a monster in that timeline never happens.

== Development ==
=== Writing ===
Co-writer Jeff Katz had plans for The Nightmare Warriors as soon as the first Freddy vs. Jason vs. Ash moved from film to the comic book medium. He says, "I basically knew most of the larger strokes of what I'd want to do to cap the Vs. "trilogy", so to speak. In many ways, it's very simply been about - "What would I most want to see as a fan?" And as a fan of these franchises, what I appreciate more than anything is a sense of continuity." Katz claims that these horror franchises were always best when they carried characters over from film to film, and that the aim of Nightmare Warriors was "about tying everything together". The subtitle, The Nightmare Warriors, was a homage to A Nightmare on Elm Street 3: Dream Warriors, Katz's favorite entry of that series. Kuhoric feels the title is fitting since Nightmare Warriors is a survivor's story.

"With remakes of Friday and now Nightmare, we are in many ways the stewards of the classic continuity and it's a responsibility we don't take lightly."
— Jeff Katz on what the series means to him.

The writers' biggest concern was making sure the characters' voices felt accurate. James Kuhoric says, "A licensed comic book's first priority has to be that the actions and dialogue are true to the series they comes from. As a fan, I can't stand picking up any book that reads like the writer didn't watch the show. It's sad to say, but I've read far more bad licensed stuff than good." The writers held several discussions debating how the characters should act in certain scenes. Jeff Katz asserts that Freddy and Ash are "defined by their tones", so getting their voices right was crucial; he feels the success of the first Freddy vs. Jason vs. Ash came from their accurate characterization. However, artist Jason Craig feels that "it's a tightrope to walk"; he enjoys Freddy's wisecracks but prefers the character to be darker, stating "People forget he was a child killer. He was a very sadistic man." Discussing the relationship between Freddy and Ash, Craig says that "it's almost like watching two stand up comedians try to kill each other".

Katz points out that, after two previous confrontations, "Freddy and Jason are extremely familiar with each other at this point. Maybe the only person they dislike more than each other is Ash." While Jason wants personal revenge on Ash, Freddy's goals are "a bit larger or ambitious in scope". Katz says, "[Freddy]'s looking to clear the board of any threat or nuisance before he launches his final gambit. I can promise relationships will evolve in some very interesting ways in this one." He compares Ash's story in the series to Lieutenant Frank Drebin (Leslie Nielsen) in Naked Gun 33 1/3: The Final Insult; "he's trying to embrace domestic life but often can't get out of his own way. The trusty old chainsaw is mounted on the mantle over the fireplace at this point. He's very much retired. But he'll learn very quickly that the Chosen One will never be able to retire. It's an eternal quest, really." However, Katz says that Ash "is not alone in this battle" and that there are other survivors like him, "people with special skills or purposes that have guided them successfully through encounters with Freddy or Jason". He asks, "who doesn't want to see Ash and Tommy Jarvis fight for the alpha male slot? That's too rich an opportunity to pass up."

"I'd say that if Ash is Superman, the Nightmare Warriors are his Justice League."
— Jeff Katz compares the characters to a comic book superhero team.

Katz describes Tommy as "the wild card in our group". His sole priority is to kill Jason and "[e]verything else is incidental". The writers enjoyed developing the "natural rivalry" between Ash and Tommy; Craig compares them to Butch Cassidy and the Sundance Kid, "these two men, who when together are completely at odds against one another, two alpha males, but when things get tough, the two find themselves working together side by side". Kuhoric believes Tommy is a "Chosen One" like Ash, albeit with "a different approach to his supernatural calling". He compares Jason's relationship to Tommy to that between Captain Ahab and Moby Dick; "it is Tommy who has escaped from Jason's clutches time and time again".

Kuhoric describes the returning survivors from the films as "a huge part of the overall story arc". He explains, "See, there is something special about people who managed to survive encounters with Freddy and Jason. They have an inner strength that makes their souls much more powerful to our maniac killers. And it's that same inner strength that makes them a threat, especially the ultimate F13 survivor, Tommy Jarvis." According to Kuhoric, the characters of The Nightmare Warriors are all "chosen ones", "led by the one true Chosen One, Ash Williams". Katz says, "Exploring the dynamic between all of these characters has been a lot of fun and it's something I think the fans will hugely enjoy", while Craig reveals "One of the things we tried to do was connect all the dots and bring all three storylines together in one linear history". Jason Craig describes the story as "X-Files meets horror", due to the government's involvement. He points out how this vaguely foreshadows Jason X, set chronologically after Nightmare Warriors, in which Jason has been captured by the government, who wish to turn his regenerative abilities into a weapon. Craig says, "This is a story that gets out of camp grounds, or cabins in the woods, and takes place at our nation's capital".

The Nightmare Warriors was originally designed as a 12-issue maxi-series, and it was up to Kuhoric to condense it to six issues. Katz was pleased with the result, claiming "All the major beats are there everyone gets their time to shine. [Kuhoric]'s terrific at retaining the tone of these characters, which isn't easy to do when you're juggling so many voices. Katz summarizes The Nightmare Warriors as a "labor of love", and a "love letter to these characters as well as the survivors we've come to know and love over the years". He asks readers to think of the series as being "for fans, by fans". Craig labels it a "fan boy's wet dream", saying "This is the DC Crisis of horror. This is the movie they could never afford to make".

=== Visuals ===
The Nightmare Warriors is drawn by Jason Craig, who previously worked on the first Freddy vs. Jason vs. Ash and Wildstorm's Nightmare on Elm Street comics. Craig was concerned with capturing the physical likenesses and mannerisms of the characters. He explains, "Freddy isn't some man that slashes maniacally like a super villain, he has panache. Robert Englund told me once that the character moves in dance steps, foot over foot, very elegant, it's Fosse moves. Remove his glove and add a top hat and cane and he is no longer Fred Krueger, he's Fred Astaire." Craig compares Jason's body language to that of a shark, "turning his head and the body follows, keeping in a straight line until something better comes along". He says that once he began to understand the characters' mannerisms, he started to see them come to life on the page.

Artist Jason Craig was proud of Jason's "half mask" design, which he felt made the character resemble the Grim Reaper.

Craig tried to maintain consistency with his work on the original Freddy vs. Jason vs. Ash comic, but says that he was "not really experimenting as much as just having fun and trying things I would want to see". He based the characters' looks on the Freddy vs. Jason movie, but also cites Friday the 13th Part VII: The New Blood as an inspiration for Jason's appearance. According to him, "Freddy's never had a consistent look, and Ash is always Ash, so it really goes back to focusing more on keeping the look of the first series which was a continuation of the FvJ Ronny Yu film." In The Nightmare Warriors, Jason still bears the injuries he suffered in the first Freddy vs. Jason vs. Ash series. His mask is shot in half, displaying his teeth, and his left arm is cut off with a machete imbedded in the stump. Craig claims it was difficult to keep track of these injuries panel-to-panel, but was especially proud of the "half mask" look, a design he would like to see incorporated into the Friday the 13th films one day. He says, "It's a way to show Jason's emotions under the mask while still keeping him mysterious, and it's also a way to give him this Grim Reaper look especially when you see him in shadow.

Discussing the level of gore in the story, Kurhoric says, "Jason Craig is scary when it comes to the amount of detail he puts into his death scenes. [...] He lives for gore and tries to one up each panel in intensity." He describes The Nightmare Warriors as "a blood bath of epic proportions", and says that the creative team took the "big screen sequel approach" of increasing the action and violence. Katz elaborates, "Like any good sequel, the mantra is bigger and better. We're looking to up the ante and top ourselves. This premise is inherently larger scale and more epic in nature, so that lends itself to blowing open the artwork." Using the MPAA rating system as an analogy, Katz labels Nightmare Warriors a hard-R in terms of gore", saying "we're hardly scrimping on the red stuff. It's just presented on a much larger canvas this time". In contrast, Craig claims that the gore was "toned down maybe just a tad to compromise more with the Army of Darkness franchise". He explains that the Evil Dead/Army of Darkness movies "have an obvious humor in the gore" which makes it easier to swallow than that of the Nightmare on Elm Street and Friday the 13th kills, which are "grounded more in reality". His artistic aim was to "show the brutality without showing some of the intense gore yet still leave you with that feeling that you saw something horrible".

== Reception ==
Describing #1 as "predictable and a fair bit cheesy", IGN's Jesse Schedeen claimed there is a lot to dislike about Nightmare Warriors, "but only if you approach it from the wrong mindset". Provided readers expect no more than a "camp romp", he admitted that the issue is fun and humorous. Schedeen also praised Craig's "snazzy pencils", stating "as long as the story is going the goofball route, there's no reason the art can't follow suit". Mike Fish of Fangoria felt that #1 signaled an improvement over the "mediocre" first series, as the writers dropped the "cut and paste a movie" formula and replaced with a "refreshing start to an intriguing matchup". Fish praised the initial focus on Jason and Ash and the more "mature" writing from Katz and Kuhoric. He described the drawings as "kick ass", since it resembles the films without looking photocopied. However, he noted that Craig's Ash seems based on Bruce Campbell in Bubba Ho-tep, which "disrupts the characterization of Ash a little bit".

Total Sci-Fi Online's James Skipp believed that #1 struggles to balance its three main characters, with the Freddy story coming across as "a little intrusive and confusing". He also criticized Ash's characterization, believing that he was "more of a straightforward hero here [...] than the self-deprecating fellow of the Evil Dead movies", but admitted it was hard to capture the character's "idiosyncratic charm" without Bruce Campbell. Skipp summarized that the issue was adequate for its concept.
