= Wrestling Retribution Project =

- Genre: Sports entertainment Professional wrestling
- Created by: Jeff Katz
- Country of origin: United States

Production
- Production locations: Henson Recording Studios, Los Angeles, California
- Camera setup: Multiple-camera setup

Original release
- Network: Justin.tv
- Release: March 2020

Wrestling Retribution Project was a planned professional wrestling television program developed by Jeff Katz. Founded in 2011, the promotion was based on a 13-week serial schedule. Upon completion of production, the program was to be distributed by Image Entertainment, and available via streaming media and DVD.

== History ==
In early 2011, Former VP of Production at 20th Century Fox and New Line Cinema, Jeff Katz, began venting frustrations via his Twitter page with the current wrestling product broadcast worldwide by companies such as WWE and TNA. In May 2011, he began a fundraising drive via the crowdfunding website Kickstarter with a goal to raise $100,000 for an alternative wrestling venture. By June 21, 2011, the goal was achieved through 187 pledges. Shortly thereafter, casting and pre-production of the series began. A thirteen-week first season was taped from October 10 to 12, 2011, at the Henson Recording Studios in Los Angeles, California. Fergal Devitt and Shawn Spears, who were both announced for the tapings, could not make it due to visa issues.

The project name was changed from Wrestling Revolution Project to Wrestling Retribution Project on November 21, 2011.

The project has faced numerous criticisms from donors, frustrated by the lack of information about whether the project is still forthcoming and what their money was spent on.

In June 2013 an update was posted to the Kickstarter page, with a link to the video of their Champion's Grail battle royal.

To date, the Kickstarter backers of the project have not received the end product which they funded, as Katz has not released the promised episodic footage.

On the Talk is Jericho podcast with Kenny Omega, Chris Jericho revealed that he helped fund the project but never saw the footage, and Omega told a story about how he broke a chandelier during filming when he performed an outside springboard moonsault to Karl Anderson and then was forced to work for free the rest of the tapings to pay for the damage.

In March 2020, during the COVID-19 pandemic, Katz decided to upload the footage onto YouTube.

== Cast ==
The cast of WRP was unveiled via Geekweek.com, and includes wrestlers with experience with both major promotions, as well as the independent circuit.

Ring name	Real name	In other promotions/previous experience
Aphrodite	Trisha LaFache	Actress.
B.B.C.	Timothy Thatcher	Longest reigning Evolve Champion of all time.
Bobby Hollywood	Kevin McDonald	Better known as KM. Former WWE developmental wrestler Kevin Matthews. Best known for his time in Impact Wrestling.
Brick Shithouse	Ben Muth	Former left tackle with the Stanford Cardinal, retired from football due to injury. Trained in wrestling under Lance Storm.
Chase Walker	Joseph Meehan	Better known as Joey Ryan. One of the co-founders of Pro Wrestling Guerrilla, a former PWG World Champion and NWA World Tag Team Champion. Has also competed in Ring of Honor and appeared as an extra on WWE programming.
Chris Hyde	Chris Spradlin	Better known as Chris Hero, also known for his WWE tenure under the name Kassius Ohno. Former CZW World Heavyweight Champion and PWG World Champion. One half of The Kings of Wrestling with Claudio Castagnoli, who are the former Chikara Campeones de Parejas, CZW World Tag Team Champions and ROH World Tag Team Champions.
Concrete	Christopher Mordetzky	Previously known in WWE as Chris Masters.
Das Nihilist	Emil Sitoci	European grappler from the Netherlands.
Dios Dorado	Jonathan Figueroa	Better known as Amazing Red. Former three-time TNA X Division Champion, NWA Tag Team Champion and ROH Tag Team Champion.
Father Dante	Len Olson	Known as "Dr. Luther." Currently signed to All Elite Wrestling.
Faris Gotch	Dara Daivari	Previously known in WWE and TNA as Daivari. Former TNA X Division Champion.
John Cage	Brian Button	Better known as Brian Cage. Previously in Lucha Underground, PWG, Impact Wrestling, and AAA. He is currently signed to All Elite Wrestling.
John Ricker	Shaun Ricker	Currently signed to the WWE as LA Knight.
Johnny 99	Drew Hankinson	Previously known in the WWE as Festus and Luke Gallows. Also a former member of the Straight Edge Society stable and in Impact Wrestling as DOC.
Killshot	Chad Allegra	Better known as "Machine Gun" Karl Anderson. Former WWE Raw Tag Team Champion, four-time IWGP Tag Team Champion in New Japan Pro-Wrestling, and GHC Tag Team Champion.
The Lord of War	Hassan Assad	Also known as MVP. Former WWE United States Champion and the first ever IWGP Intercontinental Champion in New Japan Pro-Wrestling.
Muncie Magee	Patrick Buckridge	Known as Pat Buck, current owner of the Wrestlepro organization. Former co-owner of the Pro Wrestling Syndicate school. Competed in OVW and FCW.
Master Murder	Michael Oberegger	Works on the Canadian independent circuit as "Psycho" Mike Rollins. Trained by Johnny Devine, Scott D'Amore and Harley Race.
Profitable	Alex Zikos	Also known as "Alex Reynolds." From Bethpage, New York. Trained by former ECW star Mikey Whipwreck. Currently with AEW.
Punchline	Scott Colton	Also known as Colt Cabana in the independent circuit, and Scotty Goldman in WWE. Former Ring of Honor Tag Team Champion with partner CM Punk. Former NWA World Heavyweight Champion. Currently with AEW.
Satanic	Sam Johnston	Better known as Sami Callihan. Wrestled in WWE as Solomon Crowe. Also featured in Combat Zone Wrestling, Ring of Honor, and other independent companies. Currently signed to Impact Wrestling.
Scott "The Cornerstone" Carpenter	Tyson Smith	Also known as Kenny Omega. Held the IWGP Intercontinental Championship, headlined Wrestle Kingdom 11 after winning the 26th G1 Climax, held the IWGP Junior Heavyweight Championship twice, and co-held the IWGP Junior Heavyweight Tag Team Championship with Kota Ibushi in New Japan Pro-Wrestling. Currently signed to AEW as an executive vice president and an in-ring talent.
Stan Shooter	Ken Doane	Previously known in WWE as Kenny Dykstra. Held the WWE World Tag Team Championship as a member of the Spirit Squad.
Tommy Lee Ridgeway	Adam Pearce	Five-time NWA World Heavyweight Champion. Currently working as a trainer in the WWE Performance Center.
