= Demonstone =

- Directed by: Andrew Prowse
- Written by: John Trayne; David Phillips; Frederick Bailey
- Produced by: Antony I. Ginnane; Andrew Prowse
- Starring: R. Lee Ermey; Jan-Michael Vincent; Nancy Everhard
- Music by: Gary Stockdale
- Production company: International Film Entertainment
- Distributed by: Fries Entertainment
- Release date: 9 February 1990
- Countries: Australia; USA; Philippines
- Language: English

Demonstone is a 1990 Australian action thriller film directed by Andrew Prowse. The film stars R. Lee Ermey, Jan-Michael Vincent and Nancy Everhard. The film tells the story of two US Marines in Manila investigating a series of crimes.

== Cast ==
- R. Lee Ermey as Col. Joe Haines
- Jan-Michael Vincent as Andy Buck
- Nancy Everhard as Sharon Gale
- Peter Brown as Admiral
- Pat Skipper as Tony McKee
- Joonee Gamboa as Sen. Belfardo / Chief Pirate
- Joe Mari Avellana as Han Chin
- Rolando Tinio as Prof. Olmeda
- Marilyn Bautista as Julie
- Frederick Bailey as Navy Doctor
- Pen Medina as General
- Cris Vertido as Sung Tzu
- Noel Colet as Esteban Belfardo
- Rina Reyes as Madeleine
- Rey Malte-Cruz as Roberto
- Louie Katana as Wu
- Monsour del Rosario as Pablo
- Symon Soler as R.J. Belfardo
- Ryan Abastillas as Street Kid
- Jonic Magno as Teenage Shop Worker
- Charles Nnebe as MP #1
- David Anderson as Gunnery Sergeant
- Eric Hahn as Pilot

== Production ==
It was shot under the working title Heartstone.
