= DeepStar Six =

1989 American film by Sean S. Cunningham

Deep Star Six
- Theatrical release poster
- Directed by: Sean S. Cunningham
- Screenplay by: Lewis Abernathy; Geof Miller
- Story by: Lewis Abernathy
- Produced by: Sean S. Cunningham; Patrick Markey; Mario Kassar
- Starring: Taurean Blacque; Nancy Everhard; Greg Evigan; Miguel Ferrer; Matt McCoy; Nia Peeples; Cindy Pickett; Marius Weyers
- Cinematography: Mac Ahlberg
- Edited by: David Handman
- Music by: Harry Manfredini
- Production companies: Carolco Pictures; Sean S. Cunningham Films
- Distributed by: Tri-Star Pictures
- Release dates: January 13, 1989 (United States); April 13, 1989 (Australia, Germany); May 31, 1989 (France)
- Running time: 99 minutes
- Country: United States
- Language: English
- Budget: $8.5 million
- Box office: $8,143,225

Deep Star Six (released in the Philippines as Alien from the Deep) is a 1989 American science-fiction horror film directed and co-produced by Sean S. Cunningham. Its plot follows the crew of the titular underwater military outpost, who struggle to defend their base against the attacks of a sea monster (possibly a giant eurypterid). The film stars Greg Evigan, Taurean Blacque, Nancy Everhard, Cindy Pickett, Miguel Ferrer, Nia Peeples, Marius Weyers, Elya Baskin, Thom Bray, Ronn Carroll and Matt McCoy.

Deep Star Six was theatrically released in the United States on January 13, 1989, and received generally negative reviews from critics.

== Plot ==
Deep Star Six is an experimental deep-sea US Naval facility, with a mix of 11 military and civilian crew, now in the final week of their tour. The project is headed by John Van Gelder to test underwater colonization methods while overseeing the installation of a new nuclear missile storage platform. Already nearing his deadline, Van Gelder's plans are threatened when geologist Burciaga discovers a massive cavern system under the site. Van Gelder orders the use of depth charges to collapse the cavern, to the dismay of Dr. Scarpelli, who wants to study the potentially primordial ecosystem inside.

The ensuing detonation collapses part of the seabed, forming a massive fissure in the ocean floor. Submarine "Sea Crab" pilots Osborne and Johnny Hodges send an unmanned probe to explore, but lose contact and venture in after it. Upon finding the probe, they detect a large sonar contact moments before being attacked and killed by an unseen entity. The aggressor then attacks the observation pod "Sea Star", leaving Joyce Collins and a dying Burciaga trapped inside as it teeters on the edge of the ravine. Captain Laidlaw and submarine "Dsrw" pilot McBride - also Collins's lover - attempt a rescue. Upon surviving a near-encounter with the creature, they dock with the pod and rescue Collins, but the unstable hatch door closes on Laidlaw. Mortally wounded, he floods the compartment, forcing McBride and Collins to return to their "Dsrw" submarine and leave without him.

The remaining crew now prepare to abandon the base "Deep Star", but the missile platform must first be secured. Without Laidlaw, facility technician Snyder is forced to interpret the unfamiliar protocol. When prompted by the computer to explain the reason, Snyder reports "aggression" (due to the creature). The computer concludes that an enemy military force is attacking and advises the humans to detonate the missile warheads. Snyder complies and the resulting nuclear explosion creates a shockwave that damages DeepStar Six and the cooling system for the base's nuclear reactor, which will go supercritical and explode in several hours. With failed life support, they begin repairs to restore power and pressure for the decompression procedure.

Engineer Jim Richardson ventures outside in a JIM suit to effect repairs, but the creature (revealed to be a Depladon, some species of crustacean-like sea monster) comes after him, leading Scarpelli to conclude it is attracted to light. The crew retrieves his suit and hauls him through the airlock, but the Depladon forces its way inside and bisects him. The team retreats as the Depladon consumes the panic-stricken Scarpelli. Arming themselves with shotguns and harpoons with explosive cartridges, they venture back in to finish repairs. They succeed, but the Depladon attacks and Van Gelder dies when he accidentally backs into Snyder's harpoon. They escape to the med lab. Already badly stressed, Snyder quickly begins to unravel with guilt and fear. After a hallucination of Van Gelder, Snyder jumps into the escape pod and launches. However, since he has not undergone decompression, the pressure change from the ascent causes him to burst.

McBride swims through the flooded base to the minisub to use it as their means of escape. While he is gone, the Depladon bursts into the med lab and Diane Norris attacks it with an overcharged defibrillator. Norris electrocutes herself and the Depladon as it attacks her, allowing Collins and McBride to escape, fleeing before the reactor goes critical and explodes DeepStar Six. The sub breaches the surface, where they deploy a raft, only for the Depladon to emerge. McBride discharges the minisub's fuel, then fires a flare, killing the Depladon as the sub explodes. McBride soon resurfaces and joins Collins, as they wait for a Navy rescue team to arrive.

== Cast ==
- Taurean Blacque as Captain Phillip Laidlaw, station commander
- Nancy Everhard as Joyce Collins
- Cindy Pickett as Dr. Diane Norris, physician, and executive officer
- Miguel Ferrer as Snyder, mechanic
- Greg Evigan as McBride, submarine pilot
- Matt McCoy as Jim Richardson, submarine co-pilot
- Nia Peeples as Dr. Scarpelli, marine biologist
- Marius Weyers as Dr. John Van Gelder
- Elya Baskin as Dr. Burciaga, geologist
- Thom Bray as Johnny Hodges, submarine pilot
- Ronn Carroll as Osborne, submarine co-pilot

== Production ==
Producer Sean S. Cunningham developed the idea for DeepStar Six in 1987, with the express purpose of being the first release on the slate of upcoming underwater action/sci-fi films. Originally, Robert Harmon was going to direct the film. However, when he left, Cunningham stepped in to direct the film with a budget of $8,000,000.

The creature was initially designed by Chris Walas, who then turned his production designs over to FX head Mark Shostrom. Shostrom made slight alterations and changed the creature's color scheme. The underwater scenes were shot in Malta, in The Rinella Tank at Fort Ricasoli.

== Release ==
The film was released by TriStar Pictures in the United States on January 13, 1989. It opened on 1,117 screens and debuted in eighth place with a weekend total of $3,306,320. Its final box office total was $8,143,225. In the Philippines, the film was released as Alien from the Deep by Solar Films on April 27, 1989.

DeepStar Six was the first release of several underwater-themed feature movies released between 1989 and 1990, including Leviathan, Lords of the Deep, The Evil Below, The Abyss, and The Rift (Endless Descent). With the exception of The Abyss, none of these films were box office hits. Writer Lewis Abernathy would go on to work with The Abyss' director James Cameron and make a memorable appearance in his film Titanic (1997) as Brock Lovett (Bill Paxton)'s colleague Lewis Bodine.

== Reception ==
As of October 2026, on review aggregator website Rotten Tomatoes, the film had a rating of 17%, based on 12 reviews, with an average rating of 3.9/10.

Variety said the film was "diluted by implausibility" due to the monster's appearance being unrealistic rather than threatening, also criticizing the lack of centralized characters.

Time Out criticized the film's predictability and dialogue, stating that the only inventive aspect of the film was the design of the monster.

Janet Maslin from The New York Times criticized the film's predictability, lack of suspense and dialogue.

== See also ==
- List of underwater science fiction works
