= Freddy vs. Jason vs. Ash =

Limited series comic book

Publication information
- Publisher: DC Comics; Dynamite Entertainment
- Format: Limited series
- Genre: Slasher
- Publication date: November 2007 – March 2008
- No. of issues: 6
- Main character(s): Freddy Krueger; Jason Voorhees; Ash Williams

Creative team
- Created by: Wes Craven; Victor Miller; Sam Raimi
- Written by: James Kuhoric; Story: Jeff Katz
- Artist(s): Jason Craig; Cover: J. Scott Campbell; Eric Powell
- Letterer: Jared K. Fletcher
- Colorist: Thomas Mason

Collected editions
- Freddy vs. Jason vs. Ash: ISBN 1-4012-2004-5

Freddy vs. Jason vs. Ash is a six-issue comic book limited series that was released in November 2007 and ran until March 2008. It was published by Wildstorm (DC Comics) and Dynamite Entertainment. Based on the original Freddy vs. Jason 2 film treatment by Jeff Katz, the story serves as a crossover sequel to Freddy vs. Jason and the Evil Dead trilogy. The comic book series was written by James Kuhoric and illustrated by Jason Craig.

== Plot summary ==
Set in December 2008 21 years ago (5 years after the events of the film Freddy vs. Jason and 16 years after the end of Army of Darkness respectively), Will Rollins and Lori Campbell (the former protagonists from Freddy vs Jason) return to Crystal Lake to put closure to their experience, but Jason kills them a short while after and takes their decomposed corpses to his shack in the woods nearby. There, Jason enters a trance, and Freddy and Jason's "mother" Pamela appear to him. Freddy is now trapped, powerless, inside the mind of Jason, where he learns of the Necronomicon hidden in the old Voorhees home, with the power to resurrect him. He and Jason's mother (false Pamela) convince Jason that if he gets the Necronomicon, Jason will become "a real boy". Meanwhile, Ash Williams is called to the new Crystal Lake S-Mart to give his retail expertise to its team of teenage slacker employees. While there, he interprets a nearby Jason murder as work of the Deadites. Later, he follows a group of teens to the Voorhees house where he finds the Necronomicon before Jason appears, killing the teens.

At the S-Mart, Ash and the employees begin to make a plan to deal with Jason; however, he ends up killing mostly everyone in the store and escaping with the evil book. Freddy uses the Necronomicon to restore himself to full power and increase Jason's intelligence. Later when Ash and the survivors sleep at Carolyn's house, they are confronted by Freddy in their dreams. Ash and his motley crew of S-Mart employees confront Freddy and Jason at the Voorhees home where Freddy has already unleashed the full power of the Necronomicon, giving him reality-altering abilities. With his new intelligence, Jason turns against Freddy, attempting to steal the Necronomicon and use its powers for himself.

In a final confrontation between the three horror movie icons, Freddy resurrects all of Jason's previous victims from the Friday the 13th films as Deadites to attack him and Ash, and turns the Voorhees home into the Elm Street house. Ultimately, Ash defeats both villains with help from his coworkers, and uses the Necronomicon to open a portal, banishing Freddy to the Deadite world, while Jason and the Necronomicon itself are isolated underneath a frozen Crystal Lake.

== Collected editions ==
The series is collected as a trade paperback:

- Freddy vs. Jason vs. Ash (144 pages, Wildstorm, September 2008)

== Sequel ==
In August 2009, the first issue of Freddy vs. Jason vs. Ash: The Nightmare Warriors, another six issue mini-series, was released with James Kuhoric and Jason Craig returning to write and illustrate, respectively. The story picks up where Freddy vs. Jason vs. Ash left off and features cameos from known characters from the previous Friday the 13th and A Nightmare on Elm Street films.

== Cancelled film adaptation ==
Following the box office success and ambiguous ending of the crossover slasher film Freddy vs. Jason (2003), plans were being made for a follow-up film based on the storyline of the comic sequel which delved into the concept of including Ash Williams of the Evil Dead horror franchise and recurring characters from both the A Nightmare on Elm Street and Friday the 13th franchises. However, due to creative differences between New Line Cinema and Bruce Campbell, the film was scrapped.
