= Ani ng Dangal =

Award-giving body presented during Philippine Arts Festival

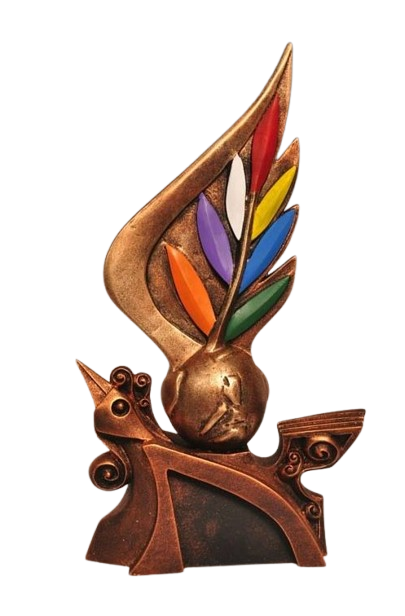
- The trophy featuring a stylized sarimanok sculpted by National Artist Abdulmari Asia Imao
- Awarded for: Given to Filipino artist or group that has reaped top honors in international events.
- Country: Philippines
- Presented by: National Commission for Culture and the Arts
- First award: 2009; 17 years ago

Ani ng Dangal or "Harvest of Honors" is an organizational award given by the National Commission for Culture and the Arts, an agency under the Office of the President of the Republic of the Philippines. It is an annual event in the Philippines celebrated as a highlight and concluding rite of the Philippine Arts Festival.

== Philippine Arts Festival ==
February of every year is National Arts Month in the Philippines. Then President Corazon C. Aquino made this declaration in 1991 via Presidential Decree No. 683. For two decades the NCCA has been supporting various local projects and special events during National Arts Month to showcase the best of the Philippine artistic and cultural scene.

In 2009, the NCCA elevated what has been a national undertaking into a consolidated international event that is the Philippine Arts Festival (PAF). PAF is the NCCA's contribution to the celebration of National Arts Month. Its tagline is “Ani ng Sining”, and the festival has proven through the years that is indeed a harvest for the arts.

The Ani ng Dangal is given to a natural-born Filipino artist or group that has reaped top honors in international events. Its coverage includes the seven art disciplines:

- Architecture and Allied Arts
- Cinema
- Dance
- Dramatic Arts
- Literary Arts
- Music
- Visual Arts
- including Multi-Disciplinary Arts

== Guidelines ==
- The Ani ng Dangal Awards recognizes Filipino talent who have won or earned the highest honors and recognition in competition and events abroad.
- The Ani ng Dangal Awards consists of 9 categories: Architecture, Cinema, Dance, Dramatic Arts, Literary Arts, Music, Visual Arts, Folk Arts and Multi-Disciplinary Arts . New categories may be added subject to deliberation of the Artistic Committee.
- The Ani ng Dangal Awards honors Filipino artists who garnered international awards and prizes from the previous year.
- The Ani ng Dangal Awards only recognizes legitimate award-giving bodies and/or competitions. The legitimacy is based on the recommendation of each committee. Others must be subjected to deliberation by respective committees.
- An international award won through mass voting i.e. online voting is not considered legitimate.
- Awardees must be natural-born Filipino citizens who either have the Philippines as their permanent residence, or have at least acquired enough years of residence in the country at the time of their win (subject to committee deliberation).

== 2023 and 2024 awards ==
The National Commission for Culture and the Arts bestowed 33 trophies at the 15th Ani ng Dangal Awards in 2023 at Malacañang Palace. Bongbong Marcos honored 26 awardees in the 16th Ani ng Dangal 2024 at the Manila Metropolitan Theater concluding rite of National Arts Month.

== Recipients ==
=== 2021 ===
CINEMA

- Alon by Gabriel Fernandez
- Ang Lihim ni Lea by Rico Gutierrez
- Ang Pagpakalma Sa Unos by Joanna Vasquez Arong
- Aria by Carlo Catu
- Aswang by Alyx Ayn Arumpac
- Benjamin Tolentino
- Breech Asher Harani
- Cristine Reyes
- Derick Cabrido
- Dingdong Dantes
- Eddie Garcia and Tony Mabesa
- Elijah Canlas
- Eric Ramos
- Filipiñana by Rafael Manuel
- Geraldo B. Jumawan
- Isabel Sandoval
- Jun Robles Lana
- Lav Diaz
- Lingua Franca by Isabel Sandoval
- Louise Abuel
- Mallorie Ortega
- Maria Diane Ventura
- Mary Rose Colindres
- Pan de Salawal by Che Espiritu
- Rainbow Sunset by Joel Lamangan
- Ruby Ruiz
- School Service by Louie Ignacio
- Tarang by Arvin Belarmino
- The Halt by Lav Diaz
- Valerie Castillo Martinez

ARCHITECTURE AND ALLIED ARTS

- SGS Design Landscape Architecture

LITERARY ARTS

- Joel Donato Ching Jacob
- Enrique Villasis and Bernard Capinpin

MUSIC

- Damodar das Castillo
- Niño Cesar Borromeo Tiro
- Josue Greg Zuniega
- Manila Camerata Artists

VISUAL ARTS

- Gabriel Agtay
- Mark Anthony Portugal Agtay
- Christopher G. Andres
- Anthony Tario Austria
- Rolando Batacan
- Ferdinand Bedaña
- Mark Belicario
- Kimberly Kate Garsain Dayo
- Buddy P. Gadiano
- Donell Gumiran
- Sherwin Flores
- Mark Frederick Abejero Jereos
- Eisa Jocson
- Edwin Loyola
- Sherwin Magsino
- Hannah Reyes Morales
- Jun Epifanio Pagalilauan
- Jaylord Plaza
- Froilan Caparas Robas
- Archt. Don Ferdinand S. Tabbun
- Maria Taniguchi
- Angelica Tejada
- Maria Felicity Tejada
- Roger Tingle
- Jophel Botero Ybiosa

=== 2020 ===
12th Ani ng Dangal Awards: Awards were given by the National Commission for Culture and the Arts (NCCA) to 1 artist for Architecture and the Allied Arts, 17 acts in Cinema, 7 awards in Dance, 3 in Literary Arts, 8 in Music, and 16 in Visual Arts.

Architecture

- Mactan Cebu International Airport Terminal 2

Cinema

- Angeli Bayani
- Alden Richards
- Barbara Miguel
- Crisel Consunji
- Dante Rivero
- Judy Anne Lumagui Santos-Agoncillo
- Jun Robles Lana
- Kristopher King
- Mamang (Produced and Directed by: Denise O’Hara)
- Martina Eileen Hernandez delas Alas-Sibayan
- Maxine Eigenmann
- Musmos na Sumibol sa Gubat ng Digma (Mac Cosico)
- Palabas: A Country in Moving Pictures (Produced and Directed by: Arjanmar H. Rebeta)
- Rina Marie Padilla Raymundo
- Rody Vera
- Signal Rock (Produced and Directed by: Chito Ro?o)
- Wing Chair (Produced and Directed by: Arjanmar H. Rebeta)

Dance

- Angelo Marquez and Stephanie Sabalo
- Bayanihan
- Halili-Cruz Dance Company
- Lairca Reigne Nicdao
- Sean Mischa Aranar and Ana Leonila Nualla
- Mark Jayson Gayon and Mary Joy Renigen
- Wilbert Aunzo and Pearl Marie Cañeda

Literary Arts

- Bienvenido Lumbera
- Kristian Sendon Cordero
- Ricardo de Ungria

Music

- Acapellago
- Imusicapella
- Joana Ruth Tumpalan
- Ligao National High School Voice Choral
- Mark Raeniel B. Agpasa
- Nilo Alcala
- Ramon Lijauco, Jr.
- UP Los Banos Choral Ensemble

Visual Arts

- AllanRey Salazar
- Anthony Into
- Celso Beringuel Creer II
- Danilo O. Victoriano, Jr.
- Donell C. Gumiran
- Glenn Campanilla
- Jesus Ramos Tejada
- Jophel Botero Ybiosa
- Jun Epifanio Pagalilauan
- Leonard Pauig Ranjo
- Maria Felicity Tejada
- Marwin Javier
- Mia Serano
- Rhedel Cabrera Sy
- Rogel Cabisidan
- Worth Wisdom Lodriga

=== 2019 ===
11th Ani ng Dangal Awards

=== 2018 ===
10th Ani ng Dangal Awards: Sixty-two (62) Filipinos from different fields of arts was honored by the National Commission for Culture and the Arts (NCCA) through its annual Ani ng Dangal Awards. 32 artists in cinema, 4 artists in dance, 2 in dramatic arts, 2 in literary arts, 8 artists in music, and 14 in visual arts
Venue: Marble Hall, Ayuntamineto Building, Intramuros, Manila
Date: February 26, 2018

Cinema

- Ai-Ai Delas Alas, “Area”
- Allen Dizon, “Bomba”
- Ana Capri, “Laut”
- Angel Locsin, “Everything About Her”
- Angeli Nicole Sanoy, “Bomba”
- Hasmine Killip, “Pamilya Ordinaryo”
- Iza Calzado, "Bliss"
- Ronwaldo Martin, “Pamilya Ordinaryo”
- Ricky Davao, “Dayang Asu”
- Brillante Mendoza, director
- Lav Diaz, director
- Louie Ignacio, director
- Raymund Ribay Gutierrez, director
- Sheron Dayoc, director
- Gino Jose, director
- Bianca Balbuena, film producer
- Jona Ballaran, costume designer
- Lawrence Fajardo, editor
- “Contestant #4”
- “E. Del Mundo”
- “Fatima Marie Torres and The Invasion Of Space Shuttle Pinas 25”
- “Flip the Record”
- “Imago”
- “Maria”
- “Paglipay”
- Pamilya Ordinaryo"
- “Pauwi Na”
- “Pitong Kabang Palay”
- “Saving Sally”
- “Sunday Beauty Queen”
- “Women of the Weeping River”
- “1st Sem”

Dramatic Arts

- Dulaang Filipino
- Mary Gracielle Burce So

Literary Arts

- Gina Apostol
- Luisa Igloria

Music

- Acapellago
- Cipriano de Guzman Jr.
- Darlin Joy Baje
- Imusicapella
- Phisix
- Roi Aldric Trawon
- University of Mindanao Chorale
- UPLB Choral Ensemble

Dance

- Halili-Cruz Dance Company
- Kristel De Catalina
- Power Impact Dancers Sirens
- Upeeps

Visual Arts

- Ainer Brean Padrigo
- Bernard Pasatiempo Recirdo 2nd
- Danilo Victoriano
- Donell Gumiran
- Edwin Loyola
- Jaime Sumugat Singlador
- Jophel Botero Ybiosa
- Jose Melencio Brillo
- Maria Angelica Tejada
- Maria Felicity Tejada
- Martha Atienza
- Baloize Art Prize
- Ramon Castillo
- Worth Lodriga

=== 2017 ===
9th Ani ng Dangal Awards: Seventy-one (71) Filipinos from different fields of arts was honored by the National Commission for Culture and the Arts (NCCA) through its annual Ani ng Dangal Awards.
Venue: Samsung Hall of SM Aura in Bonifacio Global City, Taguig
Date: February 27, 2017

Cinema

- John Lloyd Cruz
- Jaclyn Jose
- Ang Babaeng Humayo/Ang Araw Bago Ang Wakas (by Lav Diaz);
- Allan Michael Ibanez and Dexter Paglinawan Hemedez (for 1st Sem)
- Allen Dizon (for Iaadya mo Kami);
- Apocalypse Child (by Mario Cornejo; producer Monster Jimenez);
- Barbie Forteza (for Laut);
- Birdshot (by Mikhael Red);
- Brillante Mendoza (for Ma. Rosa)
- Child Hauz (by Louie Ignacio, producer Baby Go)
- E Del Mundo (for Manong ng Paaling)
- Eduardo Roy Jr. (for Pamilya Ordinaryo)
- Emerson Quintillan Texon (for Tomadachi)
- Gemini (by Ato Bautista)
- Gian Carlo Escamilla (for Walang Take Two)
- Hamog (by Ralston Jover)
- Happy New Year (by Joseph Israel Laban)
- Hasmine Killip (for Pamilya Ordinaryo)
- Imago (by Raymond Ribay Gutierrez)
- Kirby Asunto (for Exist)
- Lucky Jinx (for Giovanni Baldisseri)
- Leon Miguel (for Red lights)
- Nathalie Hart (for Siphayo)
- Paolo Ballesteros (for Die Beautiful)
- Ricky Lee
- Sandra (by Carlo Francisco Manatad)
- Scarecrow (by Zig Dulay)
- Sid Lucero (for Toto)
- Marissa Sue M. Prado (for The Sister)
- The Crescent Rising (Sheron Dayoc)
- The Equation (by Rhoda Joy Blaza)
- The Sister (by Marco Felipe Villas Lopez)
- Teri Malvar (for Hamog)
- Tomodachi (by Joel Lamangan)
- Toto (by John Paul Su)
- Traslacion (Ang Paglalakad sa Altar ng Alanganin)
- Walang Take Two (by Iglesia ni Cristo's INCinema Production )

Dramatic Arts

- Clint Ramos

Literary Arts

- Wilfredo Pascual, Jr.

Music

- Acapellago
- Andrea Melisa Camba
- Balon Dagupan Children's Choir
- Dennis Deovdes Reyes, III
- Ligao National High School Voice Choral
- Philippine Madrigal Singers
- UP Medicine Choir

Dance

- Asian Pride
- Cage
- Fmd Extreme
- Halili Cruz Dance Company
- Jamaica Jornacion and Kristel De Catalina
- Junior New System
- Kahayag Dance Company
- Luckesly Maravilla
- Neil John Casagan and Renzo Arboleda
- Olivia Bogayong
- Rica Angela Ingco
- Sanglahi Dance Troupe
- Shaira May Comeros
- Tarlac State University Performing Dance Troupe
- Upeepz
- XB GenSan.

Visual Arts

- Allan Fesalbon Castaneda,
- Ananda Wisely
- Danny Victoriano
- Jamia Mei Tolentino
- Joel Forte
- Jophel Botero Ybiosa
- Maria Angelica Tejada
- Norman B. Isaac
- Tanam (coffee-table book)
- Trisha Co. Reyes

=== 2016 ===
8th Ani ng Dangal Awards: Eighty three (83) Filipinos from different fields of arts will be honored by the National Commission for Culture and the Arts (NCCA) through its annual Ani ng Dangal Awards.
Venue: Samsung Hall of SM Aura in Bonifacio Global City, Taguig
Date: February 29, 2016

Architecture and Allied Arts

- Christian Salandanan

Broadcast Arts

- GMA 7's Front Row

Cinema

- Nora Aunor
- Cherie Gil
- Aiko Melendez
- Albert Chan Paran,
- Allen Dizon
- Benjamin Tolentino
- Brillante Mendoza
- Carlo Enciso Catu
- Epy Quizon
- Emilio Garcia
- Joseph Israel Laban
- Jun Lana
- Lemuel Lorca
- Sid Lucero
- Liza Diño
- LJ Reyes
- Louie Ignacio
- Micko Laurente
- Ralston Javier
- Richard Gomez
- Sigrid Andrea Bernardo
- Carlo Enciso Catu
- Kidlat Tahimik
- Zig Dulay
- Benito Bautista
- Francis Xavier Pasion,
- Roderick Cabrido,
- Perci Intalan
- Jeffrey Jeturian
- Will Fredo
- Louise Isabel Mendoza,
- Ida Anita Del Mundo
- Joel Lamangan
- Gabby Fernandez
- Jason Paul Laxamana
- Nash Ang
- Reggie Entienza
- Carlo Obispo
- Christian Lat
- Khavn De La Cruz
- Janice O’Hara
- Antoinette Jadaone
- Don Frasco
- Anj Macalanda
- Brilliante Ma. Mendoza

Music

- Acapellago
- Aleron Choir
- Anna Tabita Abeleda-Piquero
- Ateneo Chamber Singers
- Boscorale
- Imusicapella
- Kammerchor Manila
- Los Cantantes de Manila
- Ryan Tamondong
- Triple Fret
- University of Visayas Chorale
- University of the Philippines Concert Chorus
- University of the Philippines Manila Chorale
- University of Santo Tomas Singers

Dance

- Bayanihan National Folkdance Company
- Halili-Cruz School of Ballet
- Jamaica France Jornacion
- Lawrence Santiago
- Klivert John Mendoza
- Sayawatha
- Upeepz

Dramatic Arts

- Bernardo Bernardo
- Jhett Tolentino
- Rachelle Ann Go

Visual Arts

- Ana Katrina Miranda
- Ananda Wisely
- Herbert Bagolbagol
- Jamia Mei Tolentino
- Jamille Bianca Aguilar
- John Herrera
- Jophel Botero Ybiosa
- Maria Angelica Tejada
- Mandy Javillonar
- Robert Anton Aparante
- Ruston Banal
- Trisha Co Reyes.

=== 2015 ===
7th Ani ng Dangal Awards:Several Filipinos from different fields of arts was honored by the National Commission for Culture and the Arts (NCCA) through its annual Ani ng Dangal Awards.
Venue:Old Senate Hall, National Museum
Date: February 13, 2015

Cinema

- Lav Diaz
- Jun Lana
- Ronnie Quizon,
- Jake Cuenca
- Liza Diño,
- Allen Dizon
- Diane Ventura
- Justen Aguillon
- Nerissa Picadizo
- Sandy Talag
- Miggs Cuaderno.
- Siege Ledesma's “Shift,”
- Patricia Evangelista's “The Barber of Guiuan,”
- Will Fredo and Ida Tiongson's “In Nomine Matris,”
- Joel Lamangan's “Kamkam,”
- Francis Pasion's “Bwaya,”
- Roberto Reyes Ang's “TNT,”
- Carlo Obispo's “Purok 7,”
- Eduardo Roy's “Quick Change,”
- Pamela Reyes and Mikhail Red's “Rekorder.”
- Vilma Santos

Broadcast Arts

- Leo Katigbak
- GMA 7 - Bayan Ko

Literary Arts

- Sophia Marie Lee

Music

- Lloyd Edisonne Judilla Montebon,
- Novo Concertante Manila Choir,
- The Saint Louis University Glee Club,
- Alvin Paulin
- Aleron Choir.

Dance

- Halili-Cruz Ballet Company
- A Team,
- Xtreme Dancers,
- Johnny Sustantivo Villanueva,
- Miguel Leopoldo,
- Kayleen Mae Ortiz
- Margaret Chua Lao.

Visual Arts

- Ronnie Dayo
- Robert John Cabagnot
- Glenn Isaac, Mario Cardenas,
- Kenneth Cobonpue
- Jophel Botero Ybiosa,
- Gina Meneses,
- Phoebelyn Gullunan
- Jamille Blanca Aguilar,
- Jaime Singlador
- Danilo Victoriano
- Ruston Banal,
- Trisha Co Reyes,
- Justen Paul Tolentino,
- Jamia Mei Tolentino,
- Jesus Ramos Tejada
- Maria Angelica Tejada.

=== 2014 ===
6th Ani ng Dangal Awards: Fifty-seven artists from different fields of arts will be honored by the National Commission for Culture and the Arts (NCCA) through the Ani ng Dangal Awards
Venue:Newport Performing Arts Theater, Resorts World Manila
Date: February 2, 2014

Architecture

- Bridgebury Realty Corp.
- Maria Cecilia Cruz

Cinema

- Nora Aunor
- Adrielle Esteban
- Alessandra de Rossi
- Anita Linda
- Auraeus Solito,
- Barbara Miguel
- Briccio Santos
- Brillante Ma. Mendoza,
- Dwein Baltazar,
- Eddie Garcia
- Emmanuel Quindo Palo
- Kidlat Tahimik,
- Eugene Domingo
- Gutierrez “Teng” Mangansakan II,
- Ian Loreños,
- Inshallah Montero,
- Jericho Rosales
- Joel Torre
- Jun Robles Lana,
- Marilen Magsaysay,
- Paul Sta. Ana,
- Roger Kyle “Bugoy” Cariño,
- Ron Morales
- Roy Iglesias,
- Sandy Talag,
- Jameelah Rose del Prado Lineses

Literary Arts

- Merlie M. Alunan

Dramatic Arts

- Clint Ramos

Music

- Beverly Caimen,
- De La Salle University Chorale,
- Hail Mary the Queen Children's Choir (Immaculate Concepcion Cathedral in Cubao),
- Aldeza Ianna dela Torre,
- Jed Madela

Dance

- Bayanihan, Boyz Unlimited
- Halili-Cruz School of Ballet

Multi Disciplinary

- Eric de los Santos,
- ABS-CBN's “Matanglawin: Pasig River Earth Day Special,”
- Nanoy Rafael,
- Philip Jerome Vaquilar,
- GMA News TV's “Reel Time,”
- Sergio Bumatay III,
- Pupil,
- Jason Tan

Visual Arts

- Manny Fajutag,
- Norman B. Isaac,
- Robert John Cabagnot,
- Trisha Co. Reyes,
- Raymundo Folch,
- Orley Ypon,
- Aaron Favila,
- Jhon Vincent Redrico,
- Bianca Jamille Aguilar,
- Jamia Mei Tolentino,
- Lord Ahzrin Bacalla,
- Maria Angelica Ramos Tejada,
- Joel C. Forte
- Jerrica Shi

=== 2013 ===
The 5th Ani ng Dangal Award: The National Commission on Culture and the Arts honored Filipinos in various artistic disciplines last night at the Cultural Center of the Philippines during the 5th Ani ng Dangal Awards, the culminating event of this year's National Arts Month.
Venue:'Cultural Center of the Philippines
Date: March 8, 2013

Architecture and Allied Arts

- Arch. Abelardo Tolentino, Jr.
- Aidea Philippines, Inc.
- Kenneth Cobonpue, “Cabaret Sofa”

Cinema

- Nora Aunor, “Thy Womb”
- Adrian Sibal, “The Rivals”
- Auraeus Solito, “Busong”
- Brillante Mendoza, “Thy Womb”
- Charles Andrew Flamiano, “Letting Go, Letting God”
- Christopher Gozum, “Anacbuana”
- Eduardo Roy, Jr., “Bahay Bata”
- John Paul Su, “Pagpag”
- Lav Diaz, “Florentinahubaldo, CTE”
- Lawrence Fajardo, “Posas”
- Marlon Rivera, “Ang Babae sa Septic Tank”
- Brandon Relucio & Ivan Zaldarriaga, “Di Ingon ‘Nato”
- Marty Syjuco, “Give Up Tomorrow”
- Shamaine Buencamino, “Niño”
- Will Fredo, “The Caregiver”

Dramatic Arts

- Peter De Guzman, “The Romance of Magno Rubio”

Literary Arts

- Romulo Baquiran, Jr.

Multi-Disciplinary Arts

- BBDO Guerrero
- Kara David, i-Witness GMA 7
- Sarah Geronimo
- Wansapanataym, ABS-CBN Corporation

Dance

- Candice Adea
- Halili Cruz Dance Company
- Irina Feleo (Bayanihan Philippine National Folk Dance Company)
- Peter Laurent Callangan (Bayanihan Philippine National Folk Dance Company)
- The Crew

Music

- Arwin Tan
- Baao Children's Choir
- Edgardo “Ed” Lumbera Manguiat
- Imusicapella
- Joseleo Ciballos Logdat
- Miriam College High School Glee Club
- Muntinlupa Science High School Chorale
- Novo Concertante Manila Choir
- Samiweng Singers, Ilocos Norte National High School (INNHS)
- University of the Philippines Singing Ambassadors,
- UP Concert Chorus

Visual Arts

- Engr. Jaime Sumugat Singlador
- George Tapan
- Jamia Mei Tolentino
- Jamille Bianca Aguilar
- Zohayma Montañer
- Joel C. Forte
- Jophel Ybiosa
- Trisha Co Reyes

=== 2012 ===
The 4th Ani ng Dangal Award: The Ani ng Dangal awards are being handed out annually by the National Commission for Culture and the Arts (NCCA) to artists who have earned international awards and accolades during the past year. For this year, a total of 32 artists from different fields of the arts were given the recognition
Venue:'Malacañang Palace
Date: February 28, 2012

Cinema

- Michael Manalastas,
- Gym Lumbera and Ellen Ramos,
- Rica Arevalo and Sarah Roxas,
- Jeffrey Jeturian,
- Loy Arcenas,
- Auraeus Solito,
- Remton Siega Zuasola,
- Sheron Dayoc, Liza Diño
- Rianne Hill Soriano
- Jericho Rosales

Multi-Disciplinary Arts

- Boy Abunda
- Lea Salonga

Dance

- Halili-Cruz School of Ballet
- Bayanihan
- The Philippine National Folk Dance Company
- Boyz Unlimited

Music

- Imusicapella,
- Tristan Ignacio,
- Ateneo de Manila College Glee Club
- AUP Ambassadors Chorale Arts Society,
- Mandaue Children and Youth Chorus
- Cebu Chamber Singers
- Ilocos Norte National High School;

Visual Arts

- Cherrie Marie de Guzman-Ipapo,
- Eric Olympia Fajut,
- Gerry Alanguilan
- Danilo Victoriano,
- Trisha Co Reyes,
- Jamille Bianca Tan Aguilar,
- Ma. Angelica Tejada,
- Jesus Tejada,
- Jamia Mei Tolentino,
- Rodel Tapaya
- Reynaldo Mondez,
- Niccolo Cosme
- Jophel Ybiosa

=== 2011 ===
The 3rd Ani ng Dangal Award: The National Commission for Culture and the Arts, continues with its tradition of recognizing Filipino excellence in the arts, by awarding 32 individuals/groups with its annual Ani ng Dangal awards
Venue:Sofitel Plaza Hotel
Date: February 28, 2011

Cinema

- Nash Ang Gahan “isKWATER” and “Water”
- Rustica Carpio “Lola”
- Odyssey Flores “Lola”
- Ralston Jover “Bakal Boys”
- Monster Jimenez “Kano: An American and His Harem”
- Anita Linda “Lola”
- Jose Mateo “Prep and Landing”
- Mark Meilly “Donor”
- Brillante Mendoza “Lola”
- Francis Xavier Pasion “Jay”
- John Paul Seniel “Latus”
- Meryll Soriano “Donor”
- Lou Veloso “Colorum”
- Paolo Villaluna and Ellen Ramos “Walang Hanggang Paalam”

Multi-Disciplinary Arts

- INQUIRER.net “Anong Balita”
- Niña Corpuz “Filipino Domestic Workets: The Struggle for Justice and Survival”
- i-Witness “Ambulansiyang de Paa”

Literary

- Marjorie Evasco

Dance

- Halili-Cruz School of Ballet

Music

- Marielle Corpuz
- Margaret Ortega
- Lordenn Panganiban “Within” and “Love Like Way Back then”
- Philippine Normal University Chorale
- Vehnee Saturno “Within”
- University of Saint La Salle Chorale
- University of Santo Tomas Singers

Visual Arts

- Carlos Esguerra “Chrysler Building 8369”
- Marvin Langote “My World My Dream”
- Jerome Allen Lorico “A dress inspired by Ink and Water”
- Vance Galvin Tiu Tangcueco “Here is My Life”
- Orley Ypon “The Seekers”

=== 2010 ===
The 2nd Ani ng Dangal Award: The National Commission for Culture and the Arts, continues with its tradition of recognizing Filipino excellence in the arts, by awarding 41 individuals/groups with its annual Ani ng Dangal awards
Venue: Rizal Hall, Malacanang Palace
Date: February 26, 2010

Cinema

- Brillante Mendoza,
- Teresa Barrozo,
- Pepe Diokno,
- Gina Pareño,
- Raya Xavier
- Francis Pasion
- Alvin Yapan.
- Mark Reyes,
- Sherad Anthony Sanchez

Multi-Disciplinary Arts

- Imelda Abano,
- ABSCBN Broadcasting Inc.,
- ABS-CBN Foundation Inc.,
- Ayala Group of Malls,
- GMA Network Inc.,
- Mary Anne Therese Manuson
- QTV11 Entertainment

Dance

- Halili-Cruz School of Ballet
- Amplified Hip-Hop Dance Group,
- Rhosam Prudenciado
- Quezon City Ballet and the University

Literary

- Abdon Balde Jr.
- Gemino Abad

Music

- Young Voices of the Adventist University of the Philippines
- Ritchie Asibal,
- The Calasiao Children's Chorus
- Capitol University Glee Club
- Mandaue Children's Choir,
- Novo Concernante
- Mobbstarr: Dice and K9,
- Rhap Salazar
- Beverly Claudine Shangkuan
- University of Santo Tomas Singers,
- University of the Visayas Chorale
- The Young Voices of Negros

Visual Arts

- Ramon Castillo
- Ernesto Dul-Ang
- Erwin Lim,
- Prudencio DengCoy Miel,
- Nikki Sandino Victoriano
- Jophel Ybiosa.

=== 2009 ===
1st Ani ng Dangal Awards: The inaugural awards were given by the National Commission for Culture and the Arts

==== (Individual category) ====
- Nilo Alcala
- Vina Morales
- Reymond Sajor
- Catherine Loria
- Aria Clemente

==== (Chorale and Band category) ====
- Las Piñas Boys Choir,
- Kilyawan Boys Choir,
- The Philippine Normal University Chorale,
- The Himig Singers,
- University of the Philippines Madrigal Singers,
- University of the East Chorale,
- Novo Concertante Manila,
- Sta. Teresita Parish Chorale,
- The Mapua Concert Singers,
- Chiang Kai Sheik College Youth Choir,
- The University of the Philippines Singing Ambassadors,
- Coro de Sta. Cecilia, Cebu Chamber Singers,
- Lyceum of the Philippines Chorale,
- Mandaue Children’s Choir,
- Hail Mary the Queen Children’s Choir,
- Vox Angeli Children’s Choir,
- The University of Northeastern Philippines Chorale,
- Kjwan Band
- KHP Coro Techniuv.

==== Dance ====
- Halili-Cruz School of Ballet,
- Quezon City Ballet,
- Bayanihan Philippine National Folk Dance Company,
- Philippine All Stars
- Janssen Knights.

==== Film ====
- “Melancholia” by Lav Diaz,
- “Foster Child” by Brillante Mendoza,
- “Tirador” by Brillante Mendoza,
- “NEO-LOUNGE” by Joanna Vasquez-Arong, Ricky Davao, Brillante Mendoza, Emilio Garcia, Cherrie Pie Picache, Yul Servo, and Sid Lucero.

==== Visual Arts ====
- Joe Datuin,
- Remster Bautista
- Bernardo Matudan,
- Imelda Cajipe Endaya,
- Ross Capili.

==== Puppetry/Broadcast and Communication Arts ====
- “Reporter’s Notebook” of GMA-7
- Power to Unite Catholic Family Bible Group, Inc.

==== Literature ====
- Elmer A. Ordoñez
- Michael M. Coroza
- Miguel Syjuco

== See also ==
- Cultural Center of the Philippines
- National Commission for Culture and the Arts
