= Rodel (name) =

Rodel is a Filipino given name.

== Given names ==
- Rodel Batocabe (1966–2018), Filipino lawyer and politician
- Rodel de Leon (born 1992), Filipino basketball player
- Rodel Mayol (born 1981), Filipino boxer
- Rodel Nacianceno (born 1981), Filipino actor
- Rodel Naval (1953–1995), Filipino actor
- Rodel Richards (born 2000), English footballer
- Rodel Tapaya (born 1980), Filipino painter

== See also ==
- Raymond Rodel (1895–1967), French tennis player
- Rödel
