= Life's What You Make It =

Life's What You Make It may refer to:

- "Life's What You Make It" (Hannah Montana song), 2007
- "Life's What You Make It" (Talk Talk song), 1985
- Life's What You Make It (album), an album by Wendy Moten
- Life's What You Make It (EP) by Placebo, 2016
- "Life Is What You Make It", a novel by Preeti Shenoy
- "Life Is What You Make It", a song by Marvin Hamlisch
- Life Is What You Make It (film), 2017
