= Pilipinas Got Talent season 1 =

Pilipinas Got Talent
- Season 1
- Hosted by: Got Talent; Billy Crawford; Luis Manzano; Got More Talent; Marc Abaya
- Judges: Freddie M. Garcia; Kris Aquino; Ai-Ai de las Alas
- Winner: Jovit Baldivino †
- Runner-up: Baguio Metamorphosis
- Companion show: Pilipinas Got More Talent
- No. of episodes: 33

Release
- Original network: ABS-CBN
- Original release: February 20 – June 13, 2010

Season chronology
- Next → Season 2

The first season of Pilipinas Got Talent aired on ABS-CBN from February 20 to June 13, 2010, replacing The Singing Bee, George and Cecil and Pinoy Big Brother: Double Up was replaced by Twist and Shout.

Billy Crawford and Luis Manzano take role as the presenters of the main show, while Marc Abaya hosted its companion show, Pilipinas Got More Talent. The judges include former ABS-CBN executive Freddie M. Garcia, Kris Aquino, and Ai-Ai delas Alas.

Judges and host of Pilipinas Got Talent season 1

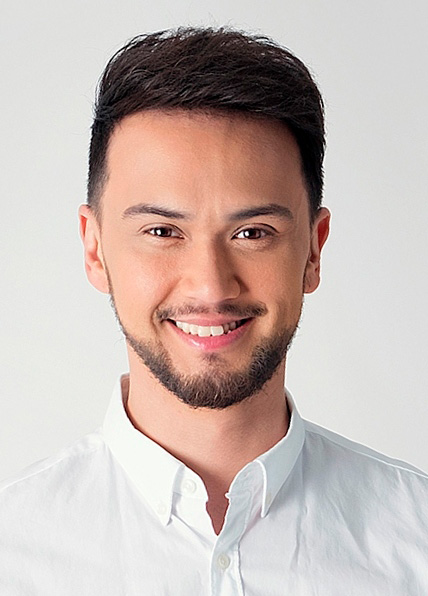
Billy Crawford (host)

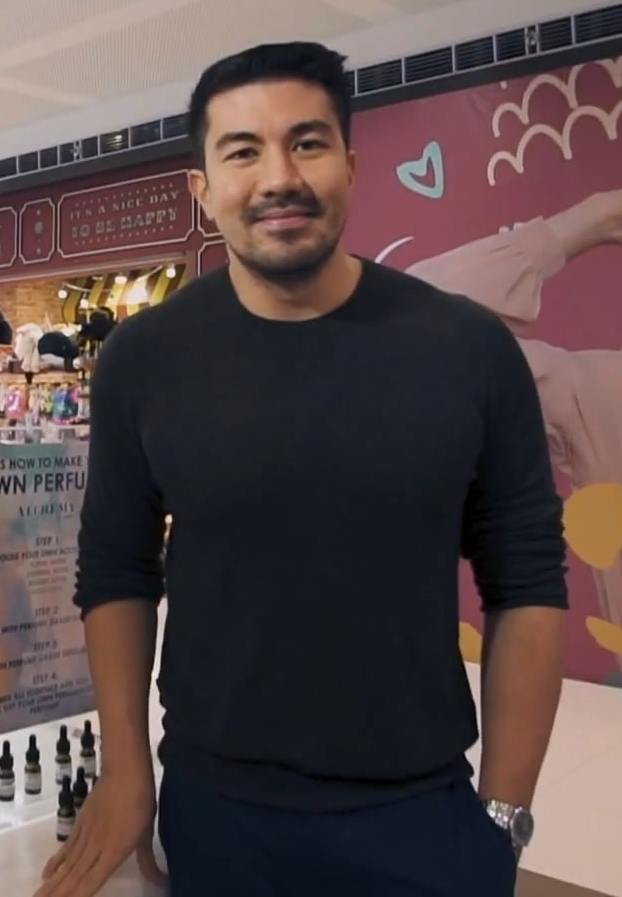
Luis Manzano (host)

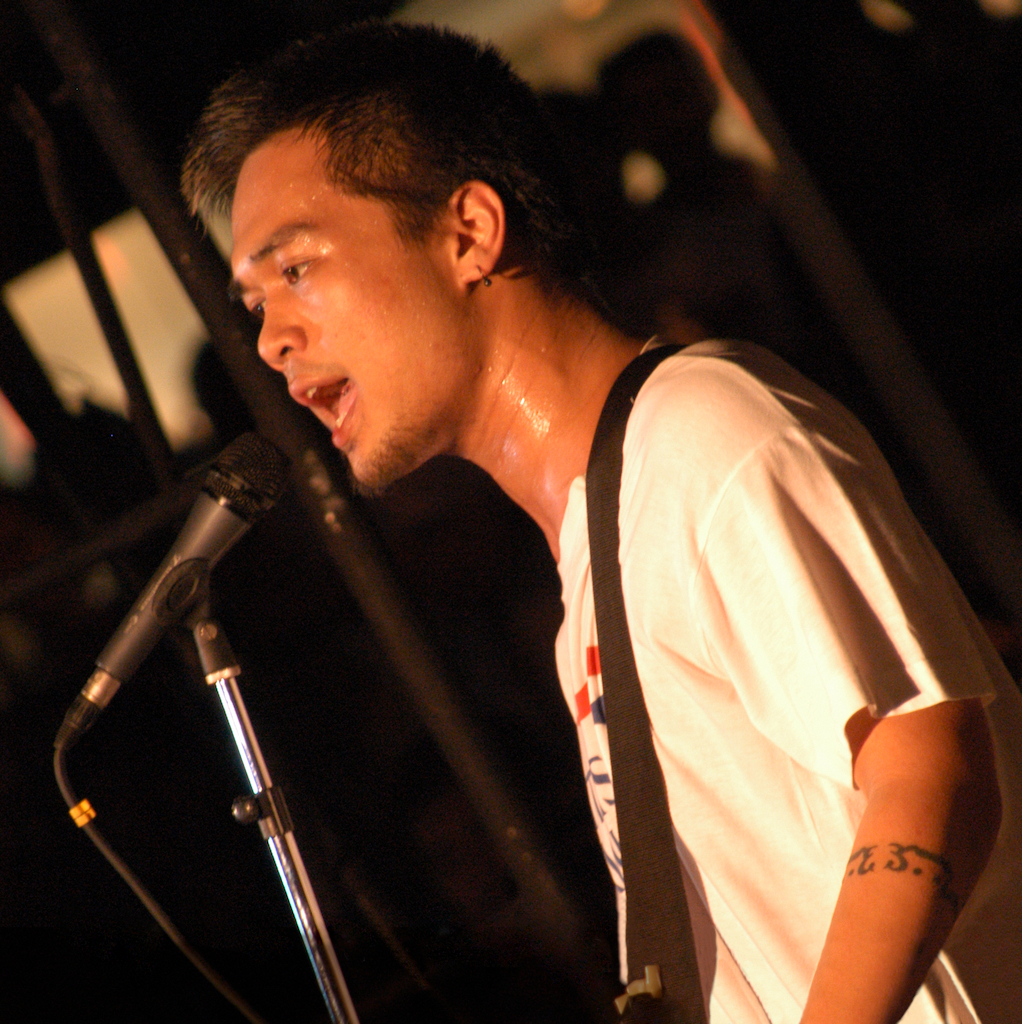
Marc Abaya (Pilipinas Got More Talent)

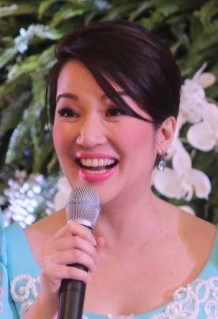
Kris Aquino

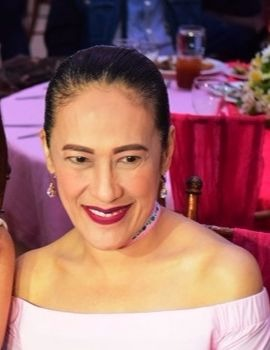
Ai-Ai de las Alas

Sixteen year-old singer Jovit Baldivino † from Batangas was crowned the first winner of the series, with Baguio Metamorphosis as the runner-up and breakdancing duo Velasco Brothers finishing in third place.

== Auditions ==
Cities where the major auditions were held.

The audition process took place throughout November and December 2009. The judges visited Philippine cities including Batangas, Cebu, Baguio, Cagayan de Oro, and Davao for three days and Manila for four days. The first eighteen shows reflected on the successful, and unsuccessful auditions overall. The first audition episodes were followed in a particular city. However, in later episodes until the seventeenth, aired auditions featured all random cities visited.

Date of Audition	Audition Venue	City
November 6, 7 and 8, 2009	Lyceum of the Philippines University - Batangas	Batangas City
November 11, 12 and 13, 2009	Cebu Institute of Technology	Cebu City
November 19, 20 and 21, 2009	University of Baguio	Baguio
November 25, 26 and 27, 2009	Liceo de Cagayan University	Cagayan de Oro
November 30 – December 1, 2, 2009	Rizal Memorial Colleges	Davao City
December 5, 6, 12, 13, 2009	PAGCOR Grand Theater	Parañaque

== Judges' Cull ==
The second round is the Judges' Cull of all 220 successful auditioned acts. It was held in the Bellevue Hotel located in Metro Manila. This is the round where the judges pick the best 36 acts to enter the live semi-finals. The cull was divided in half throughout the country, 19 acts were picked from the Visayas and Mindanao auditions and the other 17 were taken from Luzon and Metro Manila auditions. The top 36 acts will compete for the live semi-finals round for six weeks.

=== Top 36 Results Summary ===
- Winner
- Runner-up
- Finalist
- Semi-finalist (lost judges' vote)

Name of act	Age(s)	Genre	Act	Hometown	Semifinal Week	Result
Jovit Baldivino	16	Singing	Singer	Batangas	1	Winner
Baguio Metamorphosis	—	Dancing	Belly Dance Fusion and Hip Hop	Baguio	6	Runner-up
Velasco Brothers	—	Dancing	Breakdancing	Manila	3	Third place
Ingrid Payaket	21	Singing	Singer	Baguio	6	Fourth place
Ezra Band	—	Music	Acoustic Band	Davao del Sur	4	Fifth place
Ruther Urquia	31	Variety	Ventriloquist	Las Piñas	1	Sixth place
Alakim	29	Variety	Magician	Quezon City	2	Seventh place
Keith Clark Delleva	14	Music	Electric Guitar Player	Pasay	3	Eighth place
Sherwin Baguion	20	Singing	Singer	Lanao del Norte	4	Ninth place
Luntayao Family	—	Singing	Singing group	Negros Occidental	5	Tenth place
Maria Jeline Oliva	13	Music	Violinist	Naga City	5	Eleventh place
Markki Stroem	20	Singing	Singer	Quezon City	2	Twelfth place
Imusicapella	—	Music	Show choir	Cavite	6	Eliminated
Carl Malone Montecido	11	Singing	Singer	Bacolod	6	Eliminated
Hello World	—	Dancing	Dance crew	Davao City	6	Eliminated
Josephine Aton	32	Singing	Singer	Cebu City	6	Eliminated
Powerpuff Corn	—	Singing	Acoustic duo	Baguio	5	Eliminated
Experience Kidz	—	Dancing	Dance crew	General Santos	5	Eliminated
Harold Jomar Gesulga	17	Music	Beatboxer	General Santos	5	Eliminated
Jzan Vern Tero	12	Singing	Singer	Cebu City	5	Eliminated
Gerphil Geraldine "Fame" Flores	19	Singing	Opera Singer	Parañaque	4	Eliminated
Big Mouth "BM"	32	Variety	Singer with animal sounds	Manila	4	Eliminated
Goldies & Goodies	48–69	Dancing	Dance group	Cebu City	4	Eliminated
Reiniel Tulabing	11	Singing	Singer	Cainta, Rizal	4	Eliminated
Rolando Ng III	7	Singing	Singer	Cagayan de Oro	3	Eliminated
Alexis Carpena	21	Dancing	Isolation Dancer	Laguna	3	Eliminated
Manolito "Manoling" Saldivar	51	Singing	Opera Singer	Dumaguete	3	Eliminated
Reggie Ramirez	33	Singing	Double-character Singer	Davao City	3	Eliminated
Kapidamu Band	10–16	Music	Band	Quezon	2	Eliminated
Florante Inutan	41	Music	Human Saxophone	Davao City	2	Eliminated
Garrett Devan Bolden, Jr.	18	Singing	Singer	Olongapo City	2	Eliminated
Mae Lozada & Anselmo Estillore	—	Dancing	Ballroom Dancing duo	Cebu City	2	Eliminated
Rolando Permangil	35	Singing	Singer	Davao City	1	Eliminated
Baguio Siblings	—	Dancing	Ballroom Dancing duo	Cebu City	1	Eliminated
Snap Boyz	—	Dancing	Dance crew	Cebu	1	Eliminated
Xavier University Cultural Dance Troupe	—	Dancing	Cultural Dance Troupe	Cagayan de Oro	1	Eliminated

== Semifinals ==
The semifinals ran from May 1 to June 6, 2010. The first four weeks were held in AFP Theater in Camp Aguinaldo, Quezon City and in Tanghalang Pasigueño in Pasig for the fifth and sixth week. The result shows were always held in Dolphy Theater in ABS-CBN Studios.

There are two ways to vote — SMS and online voting.

The three acts that received the lowest votes are automatically eliminated. The act with the highest number of votes advances to the grand finals. The acts that placed second and third are subject to judges' vote. The act that receives at least 2 votes proceeds to the grand finals, while the other is eliminated.

=== Semifinals summary ===
- Won the public vote
- Won the judges' vote
- Lost the judges' vote
- Buzzed out
- Judge's vote

==== Week 1 (May 1 & 2) ====
Contestant	Order	Act	Buzzes and judges' votes			Percentage	Result
Contestant	Order	Act	FMG	Kris	Ai-ai	Percentage	Result
Snap Boyz	1	Dance crew				2.21%	Eliminated
Rolando Permangil	2	Singer				5.22%	Eliminated
Baguio Siblings	3	Ballroom Dancing duo				0.60%	Eliminated
Ruther Urquia	4	Ventriloquist				9.77%	Advanced
Xavier University Cultural Dance Troupe	5	Cultural Dance troupe				2.20%	Eliminated
Jovit Baldivino	6	Singer				80.00%	Advanced

==== Week 2 (May 8 & 9) ====
Contestant	Order	Act	Buzzes and judges' votes			Percentage	Result
Contestant	Order	Act	FMG	Kris	Ai-ai	Percentage	Result
Kapidamu Band	1	Band				17.18%	Eliminated
Alakim	2	Magician				28.49%	Advanced
Mae Lozada & Anselmo Estillore	3	Ballroom Dancing Duo				9.06%	Eliminated
Florante Inutan	4	Human Saxophone				4.19%	Eliminated
Markki Stroem	5	Singer				25.32%	Advanced
Garrett Devan Bolden, Jr.	6	Singer				15.77%	Eliminated

==== Week 3 (May 15 & 16) ====
Contestant	Order	Act	Buzzes and judges' votes			Percentage	Result
Contestant	Order	Act	FMG	Kris	Ai-ai	Percentage	Result
Keith Clark Delleva^{1}	1	Electric Guitar Player				23.95%	Advanced
Velasco Brothers	2	Breakdancing Crew				21.83%	Advanced
Alexis Carpena	3	Isolation Dancer				17.69%	Eliminated
Rolando Ng III	4	Singer				20.89%	Eliminated
Manolito "Manoling" Saldivar	5	Opera Singer				11.92%	Eliminated
Reggie Ramirez	6	Double character singer				3.73%	Eliminated

^1 Delleva originally got three buzzers due to noisy and pitchy sound caused by the sound system. He was however given the chance to perform again without being buzzed out by the judges.

==== Week 4 (May 22 & 23) ====
Contestant	Order	Act	Buzzes and judges' votes			Percentage	Result
Contestant	Order	Act	FMG	Kris	Ai-ai	Percentage	Result
Big Mouth "BM"	1	Singer with animal sounds				7.11%	Eliminated
Sherwin Baguion	2	Singer				17.99%	Advanced
Goldies & Goodies	3	Dance Troupe				5.67%	Eliminated
Reiniel Tulabing^{2}	4	Singer				11.30%	Eliminated
Gerphil Geraldine "Fame" Flores	5	Opera Singer				25.05%	Eliminated
Ezra Band	6	Acoustic Band				33.08%	Advanced

^2 Tulabing also had an initial three buzzes due to low microphone volume. He actually had to repeat three times as his hat was missing on his second attempt.

==== Week 5 (May 29 & 30) ====
Contestant	Order	Act	Buzzes and judges' votes			Percentage	Result
Contestant	Order	Act	FMG	Kris	Ai-ai	Percentage	Result
Experience Kidz	1	Dance crew				12.29%	Eliminated
Jzan Vern Tero	2	Singer				5.64%	Eliminated
Maria Jeline Oliva	3	Violinist				20.62%	Advanced
Harold Jomar Gesulga	4	Beatboxer				14.56%	Eliminated
Powerpuff Corn	5	Acoustic duo				18.71%	Eliminated
Luntayao Family	6	Singing group				28.19%	Advanced

==== Week 6 (June 5 & 6) ====
Contestant	Order	Act	Buzzes and judges' votes			Percentage	Result
Contestant	Order	Act	FMG	Kris	Ai-ai	Percentage	Result
Baguio Metamorphosis	1	Hiphop and Belly Dancing group				28.78%	Advanced
Josephine Aton	2	Singer				2.56%	Eliminated
Imusicapella	3	Show choir				26.32%	Eliminated
Ingrid Payaket	4	Singer				17.97%	Advanced
Carl Malone Montecido	5	Singer				15.94%	Eliminated
Hello World	6	Dance crew				8.43%	Eliminated

== Grand Finals ==
The grand finals were held in the Araneta Coliseum. Twelve acts that won in the semifinals performed again to win the title of the first Pilipinas Got Talent grand winner. Jovit Baldivino was declared as the winner, besting 11 talents in the grand finals.

Color key

- Winner
- Runner-up

Contestant	Order	Act	Buzzes			Percentage	Result
Contestant	Order	Act	FMG	Kris	Ai-ai	Percentage	Result
Alakim	1	Magician				2.91%	7th
Sherwin Baguion	2	Singer				2.15%	9th
Markki Stroem	3	Singer				1.20%	12th
Ezra Band	4	Acoustic Band				5.46%	5th
Velasco Brothers	5	Breakdancing group				7.27%	3rd
Maria Jeline Oliva	6	Violinist				2.07%	11th
Baguio Metamorphosis	7	Hip hop and belly dancing group				15.39%	2nd
Jovit Baldivino	8	Singer				48.41%	1st
Ruther Urquia	9	Ventriloquist				5.45%	6th
Ingrid Payaket	10	Singer				5.87%	4th
Keith Clark Delleva	11	Electric guitar player				2.82%	8th
Luntayao Family	12	Singing group				2.07%	10th

== National Ratings ==
Pilipinas Got Talent Season 1 hits all-time high 43.3% national rating.
The National Ratings came from the whole-wide Philippine coverage of TV audience ratings from Kantar Media Philippines.

Show	Date	Share	Rank ( Night / Primetime )	Source
1st Audition	February 20	38.7%	1	
2nd Audition	February 21	37.5%	1	
3rd Audition	February 27	37.7%	1	
4th Audition	February 28	43.1%	1	
5th Audition	March 6	34.3%	1	
6th Audition	March 7	39.1%	1	
7th Audition	March 13	37.7%	1	
8th Audition	March 14	31.6%	2	
9th Audition	March 20	37.4%	1	
10th Audition	March 21	39.4%	1	
11th Audition	March 27	35.9%	1	
12th Audition	March 28	34.6%	1	
13th Audition	April 4	36.4%	1	
14th Audition	April 10	31.1%	2	
15th Audition	April 11	33.6%	1	
16th Audition	April 17	33.9%	1	
17th Audition	April 18	32%	1	
18th Audition	April 24	34.6%	2	
19th Audition	April 25	30.7%	1	
Semi-finals 1 (Performance Night)	May 1	36.5%	1	
Semi-finals 1 (Results Night)	May 2	33.3%	1	
Semi-finals 2 (Performance Night)	May 8	34.4%	1	
Semi-finals 2 (Results Night)	May 9	29.7%	1	
Semi-finals 3 (Performance Night)	May 15	34.9%	1	
Semi-finals 3 (Results Night)	May 16	30.7%	1	
Semi-finals 4 (Performance Night)	May 22	34.2%	1	
Semi-finals 4 (Results Night)	May 23	30.4%	1	
Semi-finals 5 (Performance Night)	May 29	35.7%	1	
Semi-finals 5 (Results Night)	May 30	27.1%	1	
Semi-finals 6 (Performance Night)	June 5	36.9%	1	
Semi-finals 6 (Results Night)	June 6	31.5%	1	
Grand Finals (Performance Night)	June 12	37%	1	
Grand Finals (Results Night)	June 13	43.3%	1	
