= Wilfredo Pascual Jr. =

Filipino essayist

Wilfredo O. Pascual Jr.
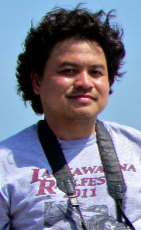
- Born: 1969 (age 56–57); San Jose City, Nueva Ecija, Philippines
- Known for: Writing
- Notable work: "Devotion"

Wilfredo O. Pascual Jr. (born 1969) is an internationally acclaimed essayist, winner of the Curt Johnson Prose Award for Nonfiction and a runner-up to the Steinberg Essay Prize. In 2016, he was nominated for the Pushcart Prize and Best of the Net. He grew up in the Philippines where his essays have won several national awards, including the Palanca's grand prize twice and the Philippine Free Press Literary Awards. He is also a board of trustees adviser and member of the Samahang Makasining (Artist Club), Inc. since 2005.

== Career ==
He received a Creative Nonfiction scholarship to Breadloaf Writers Conference and attended Squaw Valley's Community of Writers Workshop and New York University's Summer Intensive Creative Writing Program. He moved to the United States in 2005 and lives with his husband in San Francisco's Mission District where he is currently at work on his first collection of essays.

Pascual has worked in international development in 17 countries in Asia and Africa. From 1996 to 2005, he worked with the highest education officials in the region as Publications Officer of the Southeast Asian Ministers of Education Organization. From 2008 to 2013, he worked with the San Francisco-based nonprofit Room to Read as Global Program Officer where he led the language local publishing program. Pascual held international workshops on writing and illustrating for children, which resulted to the publication of over seven million copies of 700 original children's books in more than twenty local languages. In 2011 the program was awarded the 2011 UNESCO Literacy Confucius Prize. Pascual received the award in New Delhi from the President of India and the UNESCO Secretary-General.

== Awards ==
Winner, 2015 Curt Johnson Prize for Nonfiction Notable Citation, 2016 Best American Essays "You Have Me" December Literary Journal, Issue 26.2 2015 Judge and acclaimed poet Albert Goldbarth hailed its "durable, clear, grammatically sophisticated sentences... The prose here is smart and relies not on loose imagery but on tight declaration. Its mix of research into the sciences (heredity, genetics) and recounting of the personal (a father's death, a son's marriage) are savvily and seamlessly twined."

Runner-up, 2016 Steinberg Essay Prize "Terminus" Fourth Genre, forthcoming February 2017 Judge and essayist Ned Stuckey French: "... wonderfully written, very affecting... it illuminated its subject -- gay life in a global context -- in a way I at least have not seen before."

Nominated for the 2016 Pushcart Prize and 2016 Best of the Net "Animalia" Your Impossible Voice, Fall 2015. A personal essay that gathers the author's most meaningful encounters with the animal kingdom in San Francisco, Thailand, and the Philippines.

First Place, Essay, Philippine Free Press Literary Awards. "Lost and Bloodletting in Mount Kitchakut" Philippine Free Press, 2008.

While ostensibly a first-person account of a near-disastrous hiking trip on the slopes of a mountain in Thailand, the author elevates it to a rumination on identity, family, and nation. Using a funny, absurd episode involving leeches as a take-off point, he proceeds to examine the layers of meaning embedded in this unusual incident, and filters them through the multi-faceted sensibilities of a Filipino-writer-son-exile, turning the event into a metaphor for his own search for an ever-elusive sense of home. At once deeply personal and starkly universal, this essay tempers its quiet reflections with a worldly wisdom that is pointed without being cynical, elegiac without being regretful.

First Place, Essay. 2007 Carlos Palanca Memorial Awards. "Lost in Childrensville" Judge: Isagani Cruz

First Place, Essay. 2004 Carlos Palanca Memorial Awards. "Devotion" Philippine Studies, Vol. 53, Nos. 2 and 3 After many years abroad, the author returns to his country to meet the woman whose art and life inspired him. A personal essay on fandom in the Philippines. Judge: Conrado de Quiros

== Other writings ==
"Devotion 2" Kritika Kultura 25 (2015) Abstract: In 2004, the author spent a week with fans of Nora Aunor in New York during the Philippine Superstar's U.S. concert tour. This personal essay is a ruminative account of a wayfaring trip that began the year before when the author flew to Manila and met the star for the first time. It's a pilgrimage of sorts, tracking the wandering icon in Manhattan, from her hotel bedroom to Times Square all the way to the airport. It crosses time and space from aquatic Bicol and Atlantic City to mystical Byzantine times and the tumultuous years of the Marcos dictatorship. It grapples with symbols and stories, the faith and powers at work in the act of devotion; how, collectively, the fans mirror a nation's hopes for radical transformation, at home or elsewhere – a journey that ends with a stirring personal message from Nora Aunor. Ed. Joel David

"Pintig at Panganib" Likhaan: The Journal of Contemporary Philippine Literature Vol. 9 (2015). A suite of four poems in Filipino set in Bangkok, Recto, Zanzibar, and San Francisco. Ed. Luna Sicat and Eugene Evasco

"Inheritance" Esquire (Philippines) May 2015. A genetic portrait. Ed. Erwin Romulo and Sarge Lacuesta.

"Wrestling with the Batibat" Mondo Marcos. 2010. Writings on Martial Law and the Marcos Babies (Ed. Frank Cimatu and Roland Tolentino)

"A Filipino in the Charlie Brown Musical" Caracoa 2006. The Poetry Journal of the Philippine Literary Arts Council

"Patotoo sa Pelikula ng Batang Nagpakasakit" Si Nora Aunor Sa Mga Noranian. 2005. Sanaysay. Mga Paggunita at Pagtatapat. Patnugot: Nestor de Guzman

"Guns" Father Poems (Anvil Publishing, 2004). Ed. Alfred Yuson and Gemino Abad

"Para Sa Iyo Na Trenta Anyos Na Nang Umibig" (1996); "Ang Binatang Hindi Dumudungaw Sa Bintana" (1994); "Ang Totoong Dahilan Kung Bakit Limang Araw Akong Mawawala" (1993). Tatlong Tula sa Sunday Inquirer.

Lahar A musical on the Mount Pinatubo eruption (1993) Staged by the Lapiang Hinabi ng Mga Artista sa Gitnang Luson. Central Luzon State University

"Sanlibong Alitaptap" Rosas (Anvil Publishing 1992). Maikling nobela. Patnugot Lualhati Bautista
