= Twist and Shout (game show) =

- Genre: Game show
- Directed by: Bobet Vidanes
- Presented by: Gary Valenciano; Martin Nievera
- Judges: Aiza Seguerra; Jimmy Bondoc
- Opening theme: "Twist and Shout" by Martin Nievera and Gary Valenciano
- Country of origin: Philippines
- Original language: Tagalog
- No. of episodes: 29

Production
- Producer: Zodiak Entertainment
- Running time: 60 minutes

Original release
- Network: ABS-CBN
- Release: July 3 – October 16, 2010

Twist and Shout is a 2010 Philippine television game show broadcast by ABS-CBN. Hosted by Gary Valenciano and Martin Nievera, it aired on the network's Yes Weekend line-up from July 3 to October 16, 2010, replacing the first season of Pilipinas Got Talent. The show would later be adapted to the British series Sing If You Can.

== Format ==
Two teams of celebrities will play three rounds of challenges/distractions. Contestants will be made to perform the nation's greatest hits while facing a range of hilarious and humorous physical distractions. Each will be given two minutes to sing. A jury of three will decide which team gets the point for each round. However, on the October 9–10 episodes, the first three games were set on Saturday while on Sunday another three games were set, which combined from Saturday's scores. The team with the highest score automatically proceeded to the turntable.

=== Distractions ===
- The Running Machine — Contestant has to run faster in a treadmill before falling into foam.
- Ice Dip — Contestant must dip in this ice tub while singing.
- The Volcano — Contestant has to sing in this smoke belching volcano.
- The Masseuse — Contestant will sing getting massaged.
- Tap Out — Contestant must sing with a wrestler carrying the contestant.(only for male contestants)
- The Dodge Pool — The team must sing in a pool getting hit by balls thrown by their opponents.
- The Ballooney Tunes — Contestant will sing with balloons popping from his/her shirt.
- The Swing Galing — Contestant has to sing in this swing.
- The Bully — Contestant must sing in this bull-type ride or will fall off.
- The Wrecking Ball — Contestant has to sing getting wrecked by balls pushed by the opponent team.
- The Laughy Toughy — Contestant must get tickled by feathers while singing.
- The Doh-Yo — Contestant will sing with two sumo wrestlers bumping into him/her.
- The Depulation — Contestant must sing getting his legs waxed.
- The Fly Away — Contestant has sing while bungee jumping.

=== The Turntable ===
At the end of round three, the team with the most points wins. They get to play in the final round, the Turntable. The Players are required to sing the Theme Song while in the Turntable and the will win P1,000 for every second they stay singing in the Turntable. If they finish the full two minutes in the Turntable, they win the jackpot prize of P200,000. The studio audience is divided into Red Team and Blue Team. Three members of the winning team's supporters also get to share the same prize the celebrity team wins.

== Judges ==
Three judges will be present each episode. They will decide which team gets the point for each round.

Date	Judge 1	Judge 2	Judge 3
July 3 & 4, 2010	Aiza Seguerra	Jimmy Bondoc	Bianca Manalo
July 10 & 11, 2010	Aiza Seguerra	Jimmy Bondoc	Candy Pangilinan
July 17 & 18, 2010	Aiza Seguerra	Jimmy Bondoc	Joy Viado
July 24 & 25, 2010	Aiza Seguerra	Jimmy Bondoc	Andrew E.
July 31 & August 1, 2010	Robert Seña	Jimmy Bondoc	Yeng Constantino
August 7 & 8, 2010	Aiza Seguerra	Jimmy Bondoc	Donita Rose
August 14 & 15, 2010	Aiza Seguerra	Jimmy Bondoc	Mylene Dizon
August 21 & 22, 2010	Aiza Seguerra	Jimmy Bondoc	Jodi Sta. Maria
August 28 & 29, 2010	Randy Santiago	Jimmy Bondoc	Alessandra De Rossi
September 4 & 5, 2010	Aiza Seguerra	Jimmy Bondoc	Karylle
September 11 & 12, 2010	Aiza Seguerra	Jimmy Bondoc	Jericho Rosales
September 18 & 19, 2010	Aiza Seguerra	Jimmy Bondoc	Arnel Pineda
October 2 & 3, 2010	None: The Best of Twist and Shout		
October 9 & 10, 2010	Aiza Seguerra	Jimmy Bondoc	Precious Lara Quigaman
October 16 (The Finale)	Aiza Seguerra	Jimmy Bondoc	Kitchie Nadal

Resident Judge
Guest Judge

== Awards ==
- 25th PMPC Star Awards For TV (Best Game Show)- Nominated
