= Ilocos Norte College of Arts and Trades =

Public school in Ilocos Norte, Philippines

Location
- Brgy. 5, P. Gomez Street, Laoag City, Ilocos Norte; Philippines
- Coordinates: 18°12′14″N 120°35′34″E

Information
- Former names: Laoag Provincial Trade School
- Type: Public
- Motto: Hallmark of Brilliance and Excellence
- Established: 1908
- Colors: Yellow , Green
- Athletics: Sprinting: 100 Meters - 1.5KM+ Jumping: High Jump, Long Jump, Triple Jump; Throwing: Shotput, Javelin Throw, Discus
- Sports: Arnis, Taekwondo, Basketball, Billiards, Robotics, Chess, Football, Futsal, Baseball, Tennis, Table Tennis, Lawn Tennis, Atlethics
- Nickname: INCAT, Trades

Ilocos Norte College of Arts and Trades (INCAT) is a public institution in the Philippines founded in 1908. Accredited by the Technical Education and Skills Development Authority, it offers technical and vocational education (TVE) courses as well as teacher education training. Its main campus is located along P. Gomez St., Brgy. San Pedro, Laoag City.

== History ==
In 1906, first year high school classes were established in the Acosta Building, along with elementary grades. The first permanent building, Ilocos Norte Provincial High School, opened in 1909. By 1916, all four levels of high school courses were taught.

A new school building was built in 1929 on the present site of Ilocos Norte College of Arts and Trades. In June 1941 that building was razed by fire, and classes were subsequently held in the grandstands of the provincial grounds and in local rented houses. After the Japanese occupation was over, the United States aided in the rehabilitation of the building with the Rehabilitation Act of 1946.

In 1964, the Valdez-Raquiza sponsored Republic Act No. 3989 approved conversion of the school to Ilocos Norte National High School, which was implemented July 1965.

== Programs and courses ==
=== Technical & Vocational ===
- Automotive Servicing NC II
- Baking/Pastry Production NC II
- Bartending NC II
- Beauty Care NC II
- Building Wiring Installation NC II
- Computer System Servicing NC II
- Commercial Cooking NC II
- Consumer Electronics Servicing NC II
- Dressmaking NC II
- Electrical Installation & Maintenance NC II
- Finishing Course for Call Center Agents NC II
- Food and Beverage Services NC II
- Front Office Services NC II
- Housekeeping NC II
- Mechanical Drafting NC I
- RAC (PACU/CRE) Servicing NC II
- Shielded Metal Arc Welding (SMAW) NC II
- Technical Drafting NC II
- Visual Graphics Arts NC II (No longer supported as of School Year 2025-2026.)

=== Senior High School ===
==== Academic Track ====
- Accountancy, Business and Management
- Humanities and Social Sciences

==== Technical-Vocational and Livelihood Track ====
- Home Economics
- Humanities and Social Sciences (HUMMS)
- Industrial Arts
- Information and Communications Technology (Also known as Computer System Servicing)
- Accountancy, Business, and Management (ABM)
- Technical Drafting

== Radio Station ==
INCAT also operates a radio station DWAT (93.9 FM). It was relaunched on June 15, 2020, in partnership with the Laoag City Schools Division of the Department of Education. It will be used as a tool for students in the province who have no access to online learning.
