= Margaret Ortega =

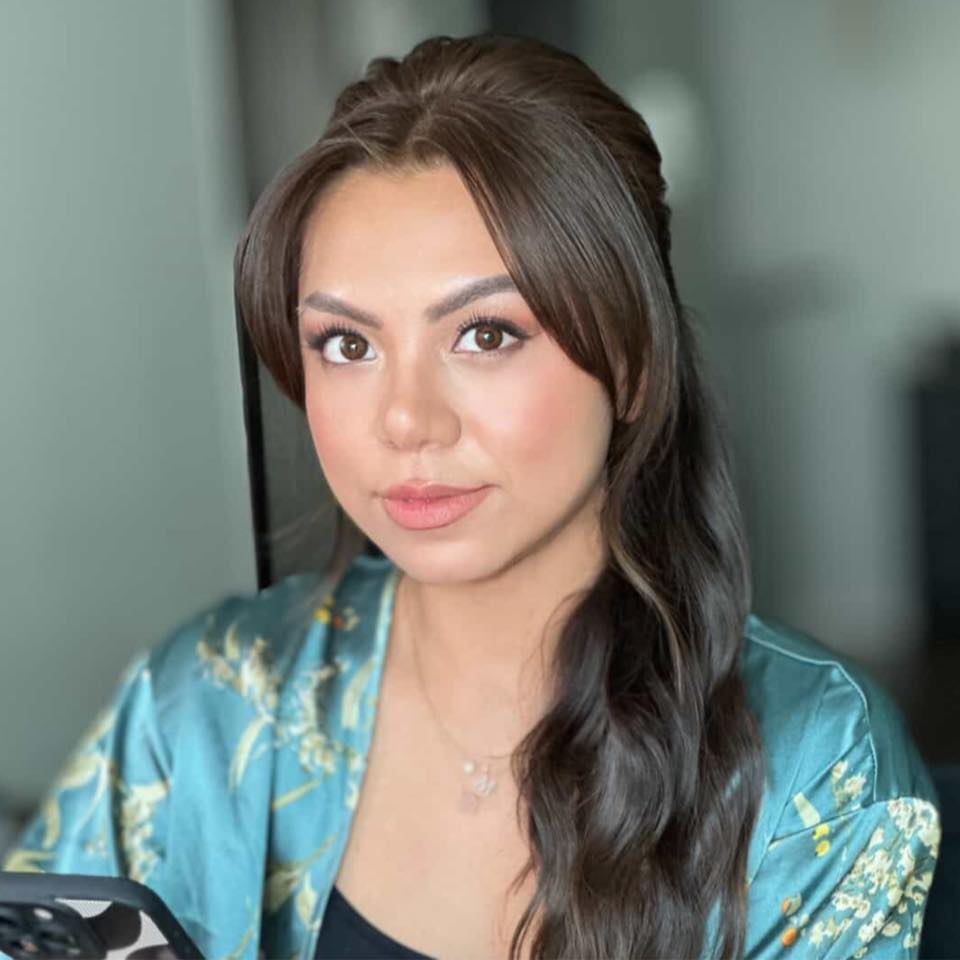

Background information
- Born: Margaret Marie Necio Ortega; November 26, 1993 (age 32)
- Origin: Manila, Philippines
- Genres: Pop, Jazz, R&B
- Occupations: Singer, actress, model
- Instrument: Vocals
- Years active: 2010–present

Margaret Marie Necio Ortega (born November 26, 1993, in Manila) is a singer-songwriter based in Wellington, New Zealand. On July 1, 2010, she became the champion of Star Factor 2010, a Hong Kong singing competition. She has been performing at numerous events since, such as the Philippine Airlines 70th Anniversary. She was under the management of ALV Talent Circuit Inc. She has also been given the Ani ng Dangal award for her achievement in music on the international stage, by the NCCA, presented at Malacañan Palace. Recently, Margaret has also been awarded an Awit Award (international awardee) by the Philippine Association of the Record Industry, Inc (PARI).

== Education ==
A graduate from South Island School, Ortega had not realised her musical potential until joining Star Factor. Margaret had been involved in many of the varsity sports in her high school. She was on the junior varsity football and sailing teams. Ortega was also on her junior varsity and varsity basketball teams respectively. A few years before Star Factor, Margaret began to teach herself to play her mother's old guitar. Margaret Ortega has completed her studies at Victoria University of Wellington. Ortega has a Masters in Commercial Law and International Business with an interest in Natural Resource and Environmental Economics. She completed a post graduate degree at the University of Cambridge in Sustainability Management. She is currently finishing an MBA in Sports Management at the Real Madrid Universidad Europea.

== Star Factor ==
Margaret defeated 12 contestants. She earned the top prize of 3,000 HKD, a trophy and a recording session at MadMax Studios. She performed "Terrified" written by former American Idol judge, Kara DioGuardi and Jason Reeves.

Ortega's win caught the attention of the international media. Her first interview after the competition was published in the Philippine Star. Interviews with many shows such as 24Oras on GMA7, Biyaheng Langit, RatedK on ABS-CBN, News5 Aksyon on TV5, amongst others.

== Music ==
Margaret's musical style is a mellow mix of soul, pop and jazz. Margaret has released some unofficial music videos and audio files on her official YouTube and Facebook accounts.

== Charity work ==
Margaret is also heavily involved with charities. At the age of five her parents would bring her along when they did volunteer work or held fundraisers. She single-handedly raised ₱1 million pesos both in cash and kind for the victims of Ondoy (2009) and Pepeng (2011). In Hong Kong, she has been actively participating in charity works for Mother's Choice and The Little Sisters of the Poor (Home for the Aged). She has also travelled to Tanzania, Africa and China to continue her charitable works.

== Television appearances ==
In 2012 Margaret was seen on Star World Asia and appears in the teasers for American Idol Season 11. Margaret also does a short interview wherein she talks about herself and about her experience with a singing competition (Star Factor).
