= Imusicapella =

Church choir from Imus, Philippines

- Origin: Imus, Cavite, Philippines
- Genres: Choral music
- Years active: 2002–present
- Members: Tristan Caliston Ignacio

Imusicapella is a Filipino church choir based at the Diocesan Shrine and Parish of Our Lady of the Pillar in Imus, Cavite, Philippines. The choir regularly sings at the Imus Cathedral and St. Peregrine Chapel.

Formed in 2002, Imusicapella has embarked on eleven (11) international concert tours in countries such as Germany, Austria, Switzerland, Hungary, Italy, France, Spain, Bulgaria, The Netherlands, Poland, Czech Republic, South Korea, Japan, Taiwan and the United States.

They were the recipient of the “General Licerio Topacio Special Award” during the 2006 Parangal ng Bayan ng Imus for being an outstanding group of the city. They were a 6-time recipient of the Ani ng Dangal Award (Harvest of Honors) in 2012, 2013, 2016, 2018, 2019 and 2020 by the National Commission for Culture and the Arts (NCCA).

Imusicapella has recorded eight CDs: You are the Light (2003), Joy to the World (2003), One More Gift (2005), Cantate Domino (2011), "I'll Make Music" (2015), Imagine (2018), and Go the Distance (2019), and Under the Heavens (2024)

== Conductor ==
Tristan Caliston Ignacio is the founder and conductor of Imusicapella. Under his leadership, the group emerged as the most awarded church choir in Asia. He is the winner of:

- Andrea Georgi]Prize, the best conductor prize in Gorizia, Italy (2018)
- Giuseppe Radole Prize, a conductor's prize for the best interpretation of a sacred polyphonic piece in Gorizia, Italy (2018)
- Special Prize for an Excellent Conducting Performance in Debrecen, Hungary (2018)
- Günther-Mittergradnegger Prize, the best conductor prize for the best interpretation of a contemporary choral work in Spittal, Austria (2015)
- Best Conductor Prize for his Outstanding Artistic Achievement in Lindenholzhausen, Germany (2011)
- Pro Musica Viva Maria Strecker-Daelen Prize, the best conductor prize for the best interpretation of a contemporary choral work in Marktoberdorf, Germany (2007)

Graduated with a degree of Bachelor of Science in Tourism at the University of Santo Tomas, he was a member of the UST Singers. He was a recipient of the Gawad Heneral Emilio Aguinaldo, the highest honors given by the province of Cavite for his outstanding achievements in the field of music as well as the Col. Jose S. Tagle Award, a young achiever's award given to Imuseños who achieved something extraordinary. He was also given the 2012 and 2019 Ani ng Dangal Awards by the NCCA.

Presently, he is also the conductor of The Sisters of Mary School Boystown Choir, the Department of Energy Chorale and the Government Service Insurance System Chorale.

He has travelled around the country as a jury of several local and national choral competitions. Internationally, he travelled to Gorizia, Italy to sit as a jury both to the Seghizzi International Choral Competition and the Seghizzi International Chamber Singing Competition for Solo Voice with Piano. He was also in Indonesia as one of the juries of the Dumai National Choral Competition in 2018 and 2019.

Doubling as the group's tour manager since 2012, he has arranged and organized eight international travels of the choir in Europe and Asia.

== Awards ==
=== International choral competitions ===
Year	City and Country	Competition	Awards
2022	(South Korea) Busan, Korea	2022 Busan Choral Festival and Competition	3rd Prize - Classical Category
2019	Arezzo, Italy	31st European Grand Prix for Choral Singing	Finalist
2019	Baden, Austria	4th International Choral Competition "Ave Verum"	Grand Prix Ave Verum; 2nd Prize - Mixed Choir Category
2019	Marktoberdorf, Germany	16th Marktoberdorf International Chamber Choir Competition	2nd Prize – Mixed Chamber Choir Category
2018	Gorizia, Italy	57th Concorso Internazionale di canto Corale C.A. Seghizzi	Grand Prix Seghizzi; 1st Prize, Finals, Polyphonic Category (Contemporary); 1st Prize, Semifinals, Polyphonic Category (Contemporary); 1st Prize, Finals, Pop and Jazz Category; 1st Prize, Semifinals, Pop and Jazz Category; 1st Prize, Unificate 1; Public Prize; Prize for Best Choreography; Andrea Georgi Prize, the Best Conductor Prize for Tristan Caliston Ignacio; Giuseppe Radole Prize – for the best performance of a religious polyphonic composition; Premio Voci Miste – for the mixed voiced choir with the highest absolute mark; Premio Speciale Gruppi Cameristici – for the chamber choir(9-20 members) which obtained the highest absolute mark
2018	Debrecen, Hungary	28th Béla Bartók International Choir Competition	1st Prize, Chamber Choir Category; Special Prize for an Excellent Conducting Performance for Tristan Caliston Ignacio; Special Prize for an Excellent Introductory Video Spot
2018	Tours, France	47th Florilège Vocal de Tours	Grand Prix de la Ville de Tours; 1st Prize, Vocal Ensemble Category; Prix du Public; Prize for the Best Staging
2018	Varna, Bulgaria	39th International May Choir Competition "Prof. Georgi Dimitrov"	Grand Prix Varna; 1st Prize, Chamber Choir Category; Best Interpretation of a Bulgarian piece by a foreign choir
2017	Takarazuka, Japan	33rd Takarazuka International Chamber Chorus Contest	Overall 1st Prize – Grand Prix; Overall 2nd Prize; Audience Prize
2015	Arezzo, Italy	63rd International Polyphonic Competition "Guido of Arezzo"	1st Prize, Mixed Choir Category; 1st Prize, Folk Music Category; 2nd Prize, Vocal Group Category (w/ no declared 1st Prize winner)
2015	Torrevieja, Spain	61st International Habaneras and Polyphony Contest	2nd Prize, Polyphony Category
2015	Spittal, Austria	52nd International Choral Competition Schloss Porcia Spittal an der Drau	1st Prize, Art Song - Mixed Choir Category; 2nd Prize, Folk Music Category; Günther-Mittergradnegger Preis for Tristan Ignacio for the best interpretation of a contemporary choral work
2013	Yeosu, South Korea	Yeosu International Choir Competition	3rd Prize, Mixed Choir Category; 3rd Prize, Sacred Music Category; 3rd Prize, Folk Music Category
2012	Busan, South Korea	8th Busan Choral Festival and Competition	Grand Prix
2011	Mainhausen, Germany	9th International Choirdays Mainhausen	1st Prize, Mixed Choir Category; 3rd Prize, Pop, Jazz and Spiritual Category
2011	Lindenholzhausen, Germany	6th Harmonie Festival	1st Prize, Vocal Ensemble Category; 2nd Prize, Mixed Chamber Choir Category; Conductor's Prize for Tristan Caliston Ignacio for his Outstanding Artistic Achievement
2011	Tours, France	40th Florilège Vocal de Tours	1st Prize, Free Expression Category; 3rd Prize, Mixed Vocal Ensemble Category
2007	San Luis Obispo, California, United States	1st California International Choral Festival and Competition	1st Prize, Required Music Category; 1st Prize, Folk Music Category; 2nd Prize, Choir's Choice Category; Public Prize
2007	Marktoberdorf, Germany	10th Marktoberdorf International Chamber Choir Competition	4th Place, Mixed Chamber Choir Category; Public Prize; Pro Musica Viva Maria Strecker-Daelen Prize, the Best Conductor's Prize for Tristan Caliston Ignacio for the Best Interpretation of a Contemporary Choral Work
2007	Montreux, Switzerland	43rd Montreux Choral Festival	1st Prize / Jury Prize; Prize for Best Programming & Interpretation; Public Prize
2005	Sopot, Poland	1st International Choirs Festival "Mundus Cantat"	Grand Prix; 1st Prize, Gospel, Spiritual & Jazz Category; 1st Prize, Folk Music Category; 2nd Prize, Sacred Music Category
2005	Lindenholzhausen, Germany	5th Harmonie Festival	1st Prize, Vocal Ensemble Category
2003	Arezzo, Italy	1st International Polyphonic Competition "Guido d'Arezzo”	4th Place, Polyphony Category
2003	Neuchâtel, Switzerland	10th Festival Choral International de Neuchâtel	Grand Prix; Public Prize
2003	Wernigerode, Germany	3rd Johannes Brahms International Choir Festival and Competition	2nd Place, Gospel and Spiritual Category; 3rd Place, Folk Music Category; 5th Place, Mixed Chamber Choir Category

=== International choral festivals ===
Year	City and Country	Festival
2019	Fano, Italy	46th Incontro Internazionale Polifonico Citta di Fano
2017	Taipei, Taiwan	Hakka Yimin Choral Music Festival
2011	Villandry, France	10th Festival Les Musicales en Confluence
2007	Nancy, France	14th Festival International de Chant Choral Nancy Voix du Monde
2003	Alzenau, Germany	UNESCO International Choir Festival
2003	Burgos, Spain	5th Jornades Internationales Musica Coral
2003	Vitoria-Gasteiz, Spain	22nd Semana Coral International de Alava
2003	Jihlava, Czech Republic	46th Festival of International Choral Art

=== National choral competitions ===
Year	Competition	Award
2009	Cultural Center of the Philippines National Choral Competition	1st Prize, Mixed Choir Category; 1st Prize, Folk Music Category; 2nd Prize, Sacred Music Category (with no declared 1st Prize winner)
2006	Festival Supermall and Cablelink Choral Competition	Grand Prize
2003	Wedding Expo Philippines Choir Competition	Grand Prize
2002	Island Cove Choir Competition	Grand Prize
2002	1st Magic 89.9 "Voices" Popcapella Competition	Grand Prize
