= The Rule Breakers =

Book by Preeti Shenoy

- First edition
- Author: Preeti Shenoy
- Language: English
- Genre: Fiction
- Publisher: Westland Books
- Publication date: September 2018
- Publication place: India

The Rule Breakers is a book by Indian author Preeti Shenoy. The book was published by Westland Books in September 2018.
