= University of Santo Tomas Singers =

- Also known as: UST Singers
- Origin: Manila, Philippines
- Genre: Choral music
- Years active: 1992–present

The University of Santo Tomas Singers or UST Singers is the premiere mixed choral ensemble of Asia's oldest university, the University of Santo Tomas. It was founded in 1992 by Prof. Fidel Calalang Jr. and is composed of students and alumni from the different colleges of the university.

== Discography ==
JB Music Producer and Label

Year	Title
1998	UST Singers 1998
1999	UST Singers 1999
2000	UST Singers 2000
2002	UST Singers 2002 (2 CDs)
2003	In Concert (Live)
2004	Celebrate
2005	Journey On! (best of...) (2 CDs)
2005	New York LIVE
2008	American Encore
2009	Farewell Concert (Live)
2010	Then Sings My Soul
2014	The University of Santo Tomas Singers (Live): Through the Years
2021	UST Singers LIVE: The Choral Works of Fidel Gener Calalang Jr.

== Awards ==
Date/Year	Location of competition	Competition	Awards received
1993	(Germany) Lindenholzhausen	Harmonie International Choral Competition	Second Prize - Folklore Category; Third Prize - Chamber Choir Category
1993	Wales	47th Llangollen International Musical Eisteddfod	Second Prize - Folklore Category; Third Prize - Mixed Choirs Category
1995	Wales	49th Llangollen International Musical Eisteddfod	First Prize - Youth Choirs Category; First Prize - Folklore Category; W.S. Gwynn Williams Jury Prize; First Prize - Chamber Choirs Category; Grand Prize - Choir of the World at Llangollen
1998	(France) Tours	27th Florilege Vocal de Tours	First Prize - Mixed Choirs Category; First Prize - Free Programme Category; Prix du Public
1998	(Italy) Gorizia	37th Concorso Internazionale di Canto Corale C.A. Seghizzi	First Prize - Polifonica Programma Monografico; First Prize - Folklore Category; Second Prize - Gruppo Vocale (no declared 1st & 3rd Prize winners); Premio del Pubblico; Premio Renascirnento Europeo (European Renaissance Prize); Gran Premio Citta di Gorizia
1999	(Bulgaria) Varna	11th European Grand Prix for Choral Singing	Finalist
2002	(Mexico) Puebla	2002 World Choral Festival	Best Choir
2002	(Czech Republic) Olomouc	2002 Mundi Cantat - Festa Musicale	First Prize - Mixed Choir; First Prize - Chamber Choir; First Prize - Folk Category; First Prize - Spiritual/Jazz; First Prize - Sacred
2002	(Italy) Gorizia	41st Concorso Internazionale di Canto Corale C.A. Seghizzi	First Prize - Folk Category; First Prize - Spiritual/Jazz; Third Prize Monographic Category; Third Prize Gruppo Vocale; 2002 Seghizzi Jury Prize; Premio del Publico
2002	(Germany) Miltenberg	4th Internationaler Chorwettweberb Miltenberg	First Prize - Polyphony Category; Second Prize - Folklore and Public Prize; Honor Prize - awarded by the Bavarian Prime Minister President for the Best Interpretation of the compulsory piece Magnificat by Josef Swider.
2002	(Netherlands) Monster	Internationaler TONEN 2002	First Prize - Sacred Category Mixed; First Prize - Secular Category Mixed; First Prize - Folk Category; Festival Choir of the Year; Best Conductor award given to Prof. Calalang; On December 30, 2003, the UST Singers was recognized as Asia's Most Outstanding Choir, an award given by the National Consumer Affairs Foundation and the Rizal Day National Celebration Committee.
2004	(Switzerland) Montreux	2004 Montreux International Choral Festival	Excellence Avec Distinction garnering the highest score in the mixed choir category; Ville De Vevey Jury Prize for Best Programming and Interpretation
2004	(Mexico) Puebla	World Choral Festival 2004	Best Choir; In August 2004, the choir was given a special recognition by the Honorable Jeremy Harris, mayor of Honolulu, declaring August 20 as UST Singers Day in Hawaii.
May 2009	(United States) California	2009 California International Choral Festival and Competition	First Prize - Required Piece Competition; First Prize - Folk Competition; People's Choice Award
April 9, 2010	(United Kingdom) Northern Ireland	17th Bangor International Competition	Grand Prize - Open Choral Competition; First Prize - Mixed Choir Category; First Prize - Madrigal Category; First Prize - Sacred Music Category; Second Prize - Light Entertainment Category; Best Visiting Choir
April 19–23, 2010	(Poland) Sopot	6th Mundus Cantat International Choral Festival	First Prize - Sacred Category (96.3%); First Prize - Folk/Secular Category (99.0%); First Prize - Spiritual/Jazz/Gospel (98.0%); Grand Prix 2010
April 28–May 2, 2010	(Republic of Ireland) Cork	56th Cork International Choral Festival	Lady Dorothy Mayer Memorial Trophy; Best Interpretation of a Piece "GAPAS" by Eudenice Palaruan
July 10–12, 2010	Wales	Llangollen International Musical Eisteddfod 2010	First Prize - Mixed Choir Category; First Prize - Youth Choir Category; Third Prize - Folk Song Category; Grand Prize - Choir of the World and The Pavarotti Trophy
July 15–18, 2010	(Spain) Catalonia	28th Festival International de Musica de Cantonigros	First Prize - Mixed Choir Category; First Prize - Folk Song Category
July 26–28, 2010	(Spain) Alicante	Festival Internacional de Polifonía y Habaneras	First Prize - Habaneras Category; Public Prize; Grand International Prize
June 11–17, 2013	(South Korea) Yeosu	Yeosu International Choral Competition	Finalist - Grand Prix; Second Prize - Mixed Choir Category; Third Prize - Sacred Category; Third Prize - Folk, Negro Spiritual and Gospel Category; Third Prize - Pop and Jazz Category
July 23–25, 2015	(Italy) Florence	4th Florence International Choir Festival	Golden David Trophy 2015 - Grand Prix; First Prize, Mixed Choirs Adult Category; First Prize, Pop, Folk, Gospel and Barbershop Ensembles Category; First Prize, Sacred Music Category; First Prize, Modern and Contemporary Music Category; Best Male Soloist; Best Contemporary Work's Arrangement ("My Heart and I" by Ennio Morricone/arr. Fidel Calalang Jr.); Best Interpretation of the Required Piece ("Vergine, O Natura Sacra" by Gaetano Lorandi)
June 9–11, 2017	(Germany) Mainhausen	10th International Choir Days Mainhausen	Gold Prize, Jazz/Pop Choir Category; Gold Prize, Mixed Choir Category
June 22–25, 2017	(Austria) Baden	3rd International Choral Competition Ave Verum	ICC Ave Verum Grand Prix Niederösterreich; 1st Prize (Gold Superior); Best Interpretation of a 20th Century Piece
September 29, 2024	Bergen, Norway	10th Edward Grieg International Choir Festival	Grand Prix; First Prize, Mixed Category; Second Prize, Folkloric Category
October 22 - 26, 2025	Derry, Northern Ireland	2025 City of Derry International Choir Festival	Oak Tree of Derry; Contemporary Music Centre Award (Best performance of a work by an Irish composer; "The Destroyer" by Sean Doherty); Bishop's Gate Hotel Award (Best performance of a work composed before 1750)
