= Jhett Tolentino =

Filipino entertainment producer

- Born: Jhett Dizon Tolentino; December 28, 1976 (age 49)
- Origin: Iloilo City, Iloilo, Philippines
- Occupations: Film and theatre producer, director
- Years active: 2011–present

Jhett Tolentino (born December 28, 1976) is a Filipino film and theatre producer. He is known for being the second Philippine-born awardee of the Tony Award, behind Lea Salonga. Having won three Tony Awards for his producing work between 2013 and 2015 and received his first Grammy Award in February 2017, he holds the record for the most wins of any naturalized Filipinos. In 2018, Tolentino was honored the Pamana ng Pilipino Award by the President of the Philippines for his non-profit work.

== Early life ==
According to his self-produced biographical documentary Life Is What You Make It, Tolentino is the youngest child of Gloria Dizon, a native of Prieto Diaz, Sorsogon and Arthur Tolentino, a native of Iloilo whose roots come from Bataan. Tolentino grew up in a severely impoverished area of Barangay Calumpang, Molo, Iloilo City, which was a few meters across the shore of the Iloilo Strait.

Tolentino attended Calumpang Elementary School (since renamed as Esteban Juntado, Sr. Elementary School) from 1983 to 1989. He entered the Basic Education Unit of University of Iloilo as a high school freshman and took up his secondary education from 1989 to 1993.

His high school education was enabled by a scholarship program promoted by the Our Lady of Miraculous Medal Parish. The scholarship grant is funded by the Meguko Society, a student organization operating at the Jesuit-run Sophia University in Tokyo, Japan. The Meguko Society caters to educational needs of indigenous children from India and the Philippines. Tolentino was awarded scholarship grants from high school to college by the organization.

He wanted to pursue a tourism degree but decided to study accounting at the University of Iloilo due to the lack of course offerings in the region. He obtained his Bachelor of Science in Accountancy degree from the university in March 1997.

== Career ==
After graduation, Tolentino worked in Iloilo City at Mercantile Credit Resource Corporation as a general bookkeeper and later, corporate secretary. He worked at Mercantile Credit Resource Corporation from 1997 to 2002. He moonlighted in multinational Hong Kong-based companies from 1999 to 2001: as internal auditor for JP Capital Partners Ltd., and as sales and marketing executive for Inside Fashion.

In 2002, he moved to the San Francisco Bay Area for a sales and marketing job at The Good Guys, while moonlighting as a waiter for Continental Caterers and as a babysitter. In 2004, he moved to the New York tri-state area for a mortgage and finance job, where he learned about the theatre industry. Tolentino received a certificate in Nursing Assistance from the American Medical Career Training Center in Jamaica, New York in December 2005. He worked as a nursing assistant in 2006, and when the market crashed as part of the 2008 financial crisis, he worked in the healthcare industry full-time.

While in New York and working in finance and healthcare, he started writing reviews of theatre shows on his blog.

In February 2016, Tolentino was given recognition by the government of the Philippines through the National Commission for Culture and the Arts-Ani ng Dangal for giving international recognition to the Philippines; and was among The Outstanding Young Men and Women of the Philippines who were awarded the same year by President Rodrigo Duterte at Malacañang Palace in December of the same year. In 2019 Tolentino won Best Short Documentary at the NVIFF Awards in Amsterdam. In 2021, Blogtalk with MJ Racadio named him one of the "75 Most Influential Filipino-Americans".

== Affiliations ==
Organizations
Organization	Position	Stint
The Recording Academy (Grammy Awards)	Voting Member	2016–present
The Broadway League (Tony Awards)	Voting Member	2015–2017
The Order of the Knights of Rizal-New York Chapter	Deputy Chapter Commander	2015–2018

== Music credits ==
Recordings
Year	Album	Credits	Label	Notes
2016	The Color Purple: New Broadway Cast Recording	Producer	Broadway Records	59th Annual Grammy Awards winner
2015	Side Show: Added Attractions	Producer	Broadway Records	Live at Feinstein's/54 Below
2014	Side Show: Original 2014 Broadway Cast Recording	Producer	Broadway Records	
2014	Leslie Odom Jr.	Associate Producer	CD Baby	Re-recorded in 2016
2014	A Gentleman's Guide to Love and Murder: Original Broadway Cast Recording	Co-Executive Producer	Sh-K-Boom Records	57th Annual Grammy Awards nominee
2013	Matilda the Musical: Original Broadway Cast Recording	Associate Producer	Broadway Records	56th Annual Grammy Awards nominee

== Theatre credits ==
Production
Year	Title	Role	Theatre
2019	M. Butterfly	Producer	Philippine National Tour
2018	M. Butterfly	Producer	Maybank Theatre
2018	Children of a Lesser God	Producer	Studio 54
2016	Tuck Everlasting	Producer	Broadhurst Theatre
2016	Hand to God	Producer	Vaudeville Theatre
2016	Hughie	Producer	Booth Theatre
2016	A Gentleman's Guide to Love and Murder	Producer	National Tour
2015	Sylvia	Producer	Cort Theatre
2015	Clever Little Lies	Producer	Westside Theatre
2015	Hand to God	Producer	Booth Theatre
2015	Buyer and Cellar	Producer	National Tour
2014	A Raisin in the Sun	Producer	Ethel Barrymore Theatre
2014	A Delicate Balance	Producer	John Golden Theatre
2014	Side Show	Producer	St. James Theatre
2014	This is Our Youth	Producer	Cort Theatre
2014	The Velocity of Autumn	Producer	Booth Theatre
2014	Here Lies Love	Producer	The Public Theater (LuEsther Hall)
2013	Buyer and Cellar	Producer	Barrow Street Theatre
2013	A Gentleman's Guide to Love and Murder	Producer	Walter Kerr Theatre
2013	Vanya and Sonia and Masha and Spike	Producer	John Golden Theatre
2013	Macbeth	Associate Producer	Ethel Barrymore Theatre
2013	Bedlam's Hamlet and Saint Joan	Co-Producer	Lynn Redgrave Theatre
2012	My Name is Asher Lev	Producer	Westside Theatre

== Filmography ==
Film Credits
Year	Title	Role
2019	Lingua Franca	Producer
2018	Confession	Producer
2017	Life Is What You Make It	Writer
2017	Life Is What You Make It	Producer
2017	Life Is What You Make It	Director

== Notable awards and nominations ==
Awards and Nominations
Year	Award	Production	Role	Results
2018	Aliw Award for Best Play	M. Butterfly	Producer	Won
2017	Grammy Award for Best Musical Theater Album	The Color Purple	Producer	Won
2016	Laurence Olivier Award for Best New Play	Hand to God	Producer	Nominated
2015	Tony Award for Best Play	Hand to God	Producer	Nominated
2015	Tony Award for Best Revival of a Play	This is Our Youth	Producer	Nominated
2015	Drama Desk Award for Outstanding Revival of a Musical	Side Show	Producer	Nominated
2014	Tony Award for Best Revival of a Play	A Raisin in the Sun	Producer	Won
2014	Tony Award for Best Musical	A Gentleman's Guide to Love and Murder	Producer	Won
2014	Drama Desk Award for Outstanding Musical	A Gentleman's Guide to Love and Murder	Producer	Won
2014	Drama League Award for Outstanding Production of a Musical	A Gentleman's Guide to Love and Murder	Producer	Won
2014	Outer Critics Circle Award Best New Broadway Musical	A Gentleman's Guide to Love and Murder	Producer	Won
2014	Lucille Lortel Award for Outstanding Musical	Here Lies Love	Producer	Nominated
2014	Lucille Lortel Award for Outstanding Solo Show	Buyer & Cellar	Producer	Won
2014	Off Broadway Alliance Award Best Revival	Bedlam's Hamlet and Saint Joan	Co-Producer	Won
2013	Tony Award for Best Play	Vanya and Sonia and Masha and Spike	Producer	Won
2013	Drama Desk Award for Outstanding Play	Vanya and Sonia and Masha and Spike	Producer	Won
2013	Drama League Award for Outstanding Production of a Play	Vanya and Sonia and Masha and Spike	Producer	Won
2013	Outer Critics Circle Award Best New Broadway Play	Vanya and Sonia and Masha and Spike	Producer	Won
2013	Outer Critics Circle Award Best New Off-Broadway Play	My Name is Asher Lev	Producer	Won
2013	Off Broadway Alliance Award Best New Play	My Name is Asher Lev	Producer	Nominated

== Special citations ==
Special Citations
Year	Title	Award-giving Body	Venue
2018	Pamana ng Pilipino Award	Presidential Awards for Filipino Individuals and Organizations Overseas	Malacañan Palace, Manila
2016	Ten Outstanding Young Men and Women of the Philippines	Junior Chamber International-Philippines	Malacañan Palace, Manila
2016	Philippine Immersion Program Delegate	Filipino Young Leaders Program	Philippine Embassy, Washington, D.C.
2016	Ani ng Dangal	National Commission for Culture and the Arts	SMX Aura Convention Center, Taguig
2014	The Outstanding Filipino American for Entertainment	The Outstanding Filipino American-New York	Carnegie Hall, New York City
