= Preeti Shenoy =

Indian woman writer

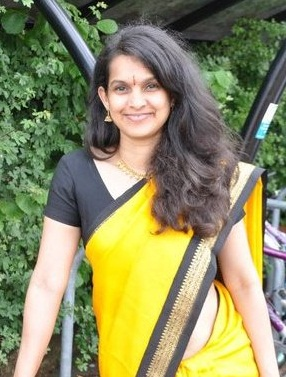
- Author Preeti Shenoy
- Born: 21 December 1971 (age 54)
- Occupation: Writer
- Writing career
- Genres: Fiction, nonfiction
- Website: preetishenoy.com

Preeti Shenoy is an Indian author, speaker and illustrator.

== Early life and education ==
During her school years, Shenoy studied at Kendriya Vidyalaya. Shenoy is also a self-taught artist.

== Writing career ==
After writing as a blogger, Shenoy published her first book, 34 Bubblegums and Candies, a collection of short stories based on real-life incidents.

The second book by Shenoy, Life Is What You Make It, was published on 1 January 2011 and became a national bestseller, along with its sequel, Wake Up, Life Is Calling.

Tea for Two and a Piece of Cake was published by RHI on 1 February 2012.

Her fourth book, The Secret Wish List was released in October 2012.

Her fifth book, The One You Cannot Have was released in November 2013. In December 2014, she released yet another fiction novel, It Happens for a Reason, the story of a single mother Vipasha. Her book Why We Love The Way We Do is a collection of essays on relationships. It's All in the Planet's was published in September 2016. A Hundred Little Flames was released in November 2017. Love A Little Stronger was released on 27 April 2018. The Rule Breakers was released on 17 September 2018. Preeti's latest book is 'All the Love you deserve', release on 17 November 2023.

== Reception ==
Mishra from Times of India says about her book a 100 little flames, 'Shenoy develops these two characters beautifully, making both of men completely credible. Gopal Shankar, in particular, is the elderly relative all of us have in our families - grouchy and opinionated but, in this case, we are treated to a wonderful back story that explains exactly why this is the case.'

Freepress Journal remarks about Wake Up Life is Calling 'You can actually feel the protagonist Ankita’s pain as the story proceeds. There were instances when the reader wanted to close the book because it was too daunting — a life so depressing. But as I kept ‘moving on’, I knew something would definitely change. Bipolar disorder — as scary as it may sound — is something which the author has broken down to simple bits for people to understand.'

Cosmopolitan has described her as "one of India's most popular authors".

== Honors and awards ==
She was awarded an Indian of the Year award by Brands Academy and also received a business excellence award from the New Delhi Management Institute.

She was a keynote speaker at the Birmingham Literature Festival.

She has also won the AutHer People Choice Award for her book 'When Love Came Calling'.

== Bibliography ==
- — (2008). 34 Bubblegums and Candies. Srishti Publishers. ISBN 978-81-88575-68-8.
- — (2011). Life is What You Make it. Srishti Publishers & Distributors. ISBN 978-93-80349-30-5.
- — (2012). Tea for Two and a Piece of Cake. Random House Publishers India Pvt. Limited. ISBN 978-81-8400-127-3.
- — (2012). The Secret Wish List. Westland Limited. ISBN 978-93-82618-18-8.
- — (2013). The One You Cannot Have. Westland Limited. ISBN 978-93-83260-68-3.
- — (2014). It Happens for a Reason. Westland Limited. ISBN 978-93-84030-74-2.
- — (2015). Love, Kisses and All Things Warm. Westland Limited. ISBN 978-93-84030-97-1.
- — (2015). Why We Love The Way We Do. Westland Limited. ISBN 978-93-85724-18-3.
- — (2016). It's All in the Planet's. Westland Limited. ISBN 978-93-86036-45-2.
- — (2017). A Hundred Little Flames. Westland Publications Limited. ISBN 978-93-86850-42-3.
- — (2018). Love A Little Stronger. Srishti Publishers & Distributors. ISBN 978-93-87022-13-3.
- — (2018). The Rule Breakers. Westland. ISBN 978-93-87578-67-8.
- — (2019). Wake Up, Life is Calling. Srishti Publishers & Distributors. ISBN 978-93-87022-60-7.
- — (2021). The Magic Mindset: How to Find Your Happy Place. HarperCollins. ISBN 978-93-54227-73-8.

== See also ==
- List of Indian writers
