= December (magazine) =

Literary magazine

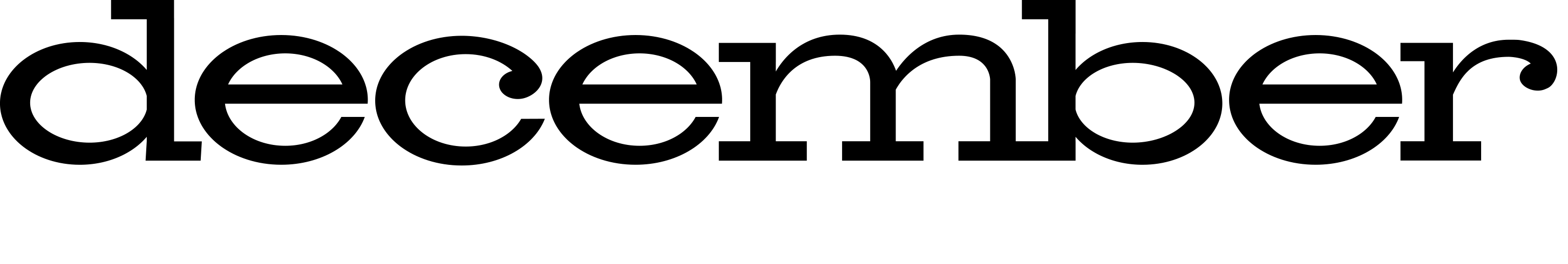
- Editor: Gianna Jacobson
- Categories: Literary magazine
- Publisher: Gianna Jacobson
- First issue: December 1958; 66 years ago
- Company: December Publishing Inc.
- Country: United States
- Language: English
- Website: decembermag.org
- ISSN: 0070-3141
- OCLC: 3902847

December is an independent nonprofit literary magazine that was founded in 1958. The journal was part of both the little magazine and the small press movements of the 1950s and was revived in 2012. December publishes original prose, poetry, and art submitted by new writers and artists, as well as previously unpublished work by distinguished literary figures. Former and current contributors include Joyce Carol Oates, James Wright, Marvin Bell, Marge Piercy, and Raymond Carver. December's mission is to promote unheralded writers and artists, celebrate fresh work from more seasoned voices, and advocate for its contributors in local literary and art communities.

== History ==
December was founded in Iowa City in 1958 at the Iowa Writers' Workshop, and moved to Chicago in 1962, where it was passed to Curt Johnson, a short story writer and novelist. Johnson privately funded december and published the journal until his death in 2008. During this time, december featured the early work of many unknown artists and writers, most notably Raymond Carver, who first appeared in december in 1963 with his short story "Furious Seasons." Writers who published some of their first work in december include 5 U.S. Poets Laureate, 6 Pulitzer Prize winners, 8 National Book Award winners, 5 O. Henry Award winners, and 9 Guggenheim fellows.

== Revival ==
December was revived in 2012 by journalist and fiction writer Gianna Jacobson, and Volume 24 was released in December 2013. December releases two issues per year. The revival issue features new material from several of december's original contributors as well as from some contemporary authors and artists. December also has two contests each year, the Curt Johnson Prose Awards, judged in 2015 by Joyce Carol Oates and Albert Goldbarth, and the Jeff Marks Memorial Poetry Prize. It accepts submissions and only publishes original, previously unpublished work.

== See also ==
- List of literary magazines
