= Life Is What You Make It =

Indian novel by Preeti Shenoy

First edition (publ. Srishti Publishers)

Life Is What You Make It is a novel by Preeti Shenoy. The book was in "Top books of 2011" as per the Nielsen list which is published in Hindustan Times. It was also on Times of India all-time best sellers of 2011.

The story revolves around protagonist Ankita who is in her 20s and has some issues from the past which haunts her. The story begins with schooling from a town where she gets into a relationship with Abhi and Vaibhav. Her thoughts get divided and confused at is going around. Ankita gets into B-School and starts working hard, becoming very competitive in nature. At college she gets cosy with another guy and starts liking him, meanwhile her parents find the secret letters written by Abhi and Vaibhav and burnt them off in front of her giving warning. Ankita gets very disturbed with events turning out in this way and get affected by bipolar disorder and the story is all about how she handles the situation and with sheer determination she overcomes all challenges to make life the way she wants.

== Plot ==
The book is set in Kerala in the 1980s. The story opens with a series of letters between the protagonist, Ankita and her childhood friend, Vaibhav, who is in IIT Delhi.

Ankita has just entered St Agnes College for Girls and makes many friends. Soon, she becomes the ace of the college, excelling in studies and in college cultural festival events. Her attraction for Vaibhav starts fading away. She meets Abhishek from another college, who confesses to having feelings for her.

Three years later, Ankita gets selected at a premier management institute in Mumbai and dumps Abhishek. Heartbroken, Abhishek commits suicide. Meanwhile Ankita starts her MBA course where she starts progressing like never before.

Ankita develops a photographic memory, excellent stamina and is able to ace her exams. She also becomes creative, witty and articulate. But soon, she gets carried away with her euphoria, becoming reckless.

Ankita falls into great depression and tries to commit suicide. She is later admitted to a mental hospital where Dr. Madhusudan diagnoses her with bipolar disorder. After many months, Ankita is able to recover from her depression and is able to manage her condition.

Fifteen years later, she has earned six degrees. She is now married and leads her life merrily with her young daughter.
