= Ilocos Norte National High School =

Public high school in Ilocos Norte, Philippines

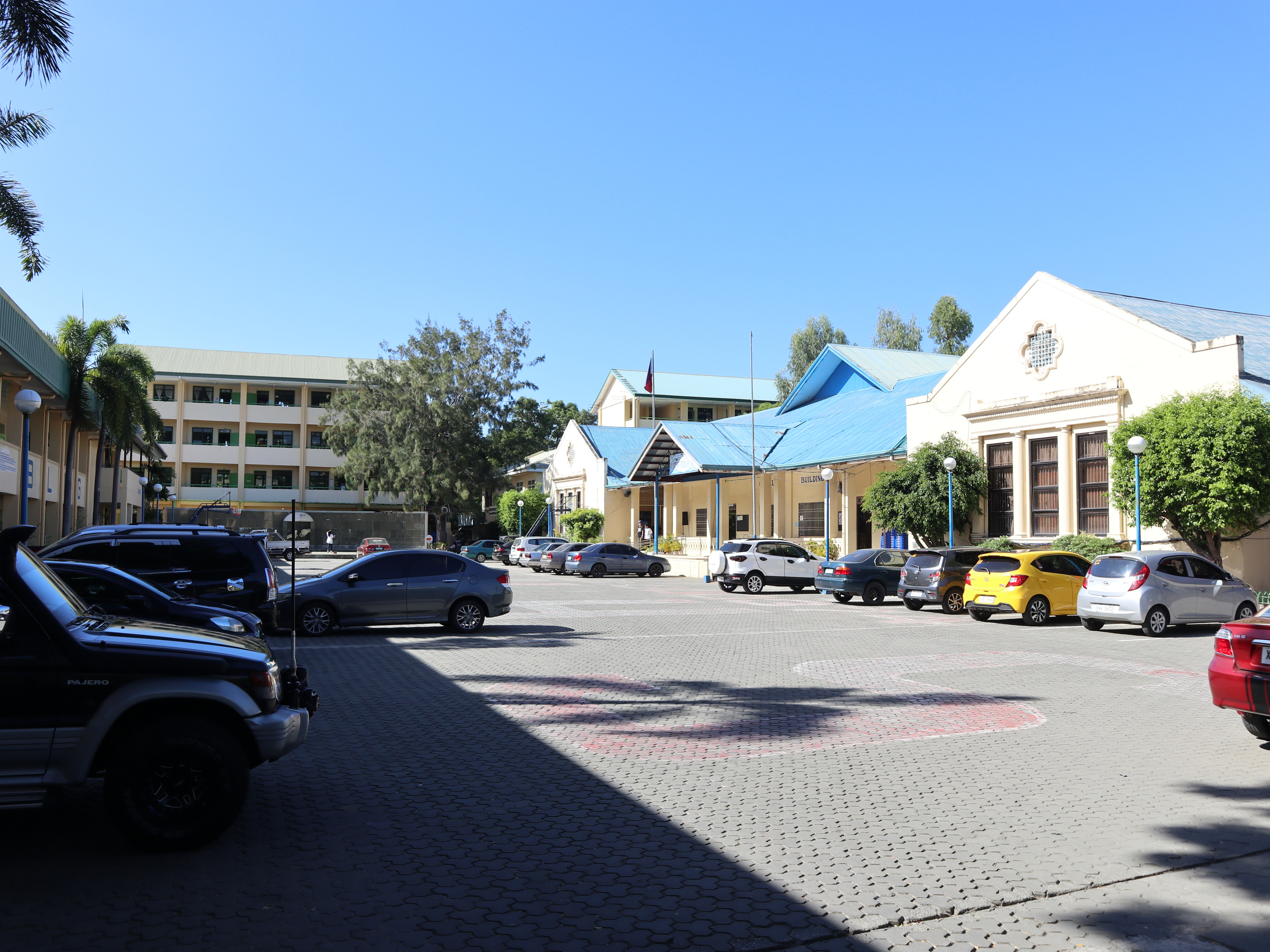

Location
- Brgy. 3, Ablan Ave. Laoag, Ilocos Norte; Philippines; 18°12′16″N 120°35′28″E

Information
- Former name: Ilocos Norte High School
- Type: Public
- Motto: 100 years of Excellence; Get INNHSpired
- Established: 1906
- Principal: Vince Cyren Agcaoili
- Campuses: Vocational Compound, Main Compound, DOST Compound, SPS Compound
- Color: Blue
- Website: www.innhs.edu.ph

Ilocos Norte National High School (formerly known as Ilocos Norte High School) is a public school located in Laoag City, Ilocos Norte

== History ==
Established in 1906 which housed Elementary grades, a second year class was created in 1909, followed by a third year class in 1910 and finally the complete high school course in 1916. Ten years after the establishment of the first year.

The first permanent building called the Ilocos Norte Provincial High School, was completed in 1909 – Two years after the Honorable Provincial Board appropriated necessary funds to cover the expenses incurred. This building is now part of Ilocos Norte College of Arts and Trades (or INCAT) as the Related-Subjects-Building. It was used to provide adequate facilities for an expanded school population, it was however destroyed in the summer of June, 1941 due to a fire. A new school building was erected in 1929 in an adjacent site where INNHS now stands. Due to the unexpected destruction of the Related-Subjects-Building, the students of the following year were forced to study in improvised classrooms in several rented houses and in the grandstands of the provincial Grounds (also known as Marcos Stadium)

During the Japanese occupation of the Philippines Girls and Boys were segregated into two separate buildings known as the Boy's High School and the Girl's High School, but after some time it was destroyed, the source of which is unknown. However, with the aid of the United States under the Rehabilitation Act of 194 the destroyed building was rehabilitated.

During its early years of its existence, the school was administered by America, the first of which was a man named George Summers who later married the former Julia Agcaoili and the last American was Muilenberg. From thence on the position was held by Filipinos, Jose Aguila held the position from 1936 until 1937.

The first alumnus of the school to be had by his alma mater is Fermin Montano.

Arsenio A. Pascua was the last principal of Ilocos Norte High School and the first principal of Ilocos Norte National High School. He was also its longest serving, holding the position for ten years ending July 1, 1967.

== Extracurricular activities ==
INNHS has a youth choir program, the Samiweng Singers. Founded in 2001, their name comes from the combination of the Ilocano words "sam-it" (sweet) and "aweng" (sound). They have won local NCCA competitions and won international awards. They have performed at the Aliw Theater and performed the national anthem during the 2022 State of the Nation Address. INNHS also has a dance troupe, which have performed at NCCA events.

INNHS also has a sports program that has received support from the government.
