= Rödel =

Rödel is a German family name. It may refer to:

== Surnames ==
- Gustav Rödel (1915–1995), German fighter pilot
- Jürgen Rödel (born 1958), German materials scientist and professor
- Manuela Rödel (born 1971), German sprinter
