= Life Is What You Make It (film) =

- Directed by: Jhett Tolentino
- Produced by: Jhett Tolentino
- Starring: Jhett Tolentino
- Music by: Dennis Sy
- Release date: 2017
- Running time: 40 minutes
- Country: United States
- Language: English/Ilonggo

Life Is What You Make It is a 2017 documentary film which explores the life of award-winning Filipino theatre producer Jhett Tolentino from his migration into the United States and his entry into theatre production in New York. The film came with a soundtrack album entitled Life Is What You Make It: Original Motion Picture Soundtrack.

== Soundtrack ==
The song "Life Is What You Make It" served as the documentary's main theme. The song won the Silver Medal at the Global Music Awards in San Diego and was nominated Song of the Year at the Josie Music Awards in Nashville, Tennessee in 2017.

== Accolades ==
Wins
Festival	Venue	Date	Awards
Mumbai Shorts International Film Festival	Mumbai, India	December 2, 2018	Best Documentary
Australia Independent Film Festival	Brisbane, Australia	November 24, 2018	Best Documentary
San Jose International Film Festival	San Jose, Costa Rica	October 24, 2018	Best Feature Documentary
South Film and Arts Academy Festival	O'Higgins, Chile	September 16, 2018	Best Feature Documentary
South Film and Arts Academy Festival	O'Higgins, Chile	September 16, 2018	Best Director
South Film and Arts Academy Festival	O'Higgins, Chile	September 16, 2018	Best Script
South Film and Arts Academy Festival	O'Higgins, Chile	September 16, 2018	Best Cinematography
South Film and Arts Academy Festival	O'Higgins, Chile	September 16, 2018	Best Sound Design
South Film and Arts Academy Festival	O'Higgins, Chile	September 16, 2018	Best Production
9FilmFest	Bangkok, Thailand	May 30, 2018	Best Documentary
Five Continents International Film Festival	Anzoategui, Venezuela	March 1, 2018	Best Half-Length Documentary
Five Continents International Film Festival	Anzoategui, Venezuela	March 1, 2018	Best Script

Official Selections
Festival	Venue	Date
London International Cinema Festival	London, United Kingdom	February 22, 2019
Central Alberta Film Festival	Alberta, Canada	February 21, 2019
Canada Independent Film Festival	Montreal, Canada	February 16, 2019
Roma Cinema DOC	Rome, Italy	February 8, 2019
Around International Film Festival	Berlin, Germany	January 1, 2019
Mediterranean Film Festival	Cannes, France	November 25, 2018
Short Long World World Festival	Corrientes, Argentina	November 8, 2018
Louisville's International Festival of Film	Corrientes, Argentina	October 12, 2018
BALINALE	Bali, Indonesia	September 24, 2018
Rome Independent Prisma Awards	Rome, Italy	September 12, 2018
Cinemalaya	Pasay, Philippines	August 9, 2018
Concepcion Independent Film Awards	Concepcion, Chile	August 7, 2018
Cyprus International Film Festival	Paphos, Cyprus	June 23, 2018
Independent Shorts Awards	Los Angeles, United States	June 5, 2018
Cinematografo	San Francisco, United States	November 12, 2017

== See also ==
- Broadway theatre
- Here Lies Love (musical)
- National Artist of the Philippines
- Musical theatre
