= Frank Cimatu =

Franklin "Frank" Cimatu is a Filipino journalist and poet from Baguio who is best known for in depth coverage of issues in the Philippines' Cordillera Administrative Region. Cimatu's coverage is often frequently published in Rappler, Northern Disapatch and the Baguio Chronicle, and by the Philippine Center for Investigative Journalism (PCIJ). He was a finalist in the community newspaper category at the HOLCIM Journalism Awards of his piece "The Zero Carbon Resort Demonstration Cottage: Retrofitting the 'Bahay Kubo' for Climate Change." He is also a cofounder and manager of the Mountain Beacon. Cimatu is also widely recognized within the Philippine literary community, having won the Don Carlos Palanca Memorial Awards for Literature twice - for works in different language divisions - in 1991. He was named the Grand Winner at the UP Institute of Creative Writing's 20th Madrigal-Gonzalez Best First Book Awards in 2021, and was bestowed the Gawad Pambansang Alagad ni Balagtas by the Unyon ng mga Manunulat sa Pilipinas (UMPIL) in 2026. He was also awarded Philippines Free Press Literary Awards twice - for a poetry collection in 2003 and an essay collection in 2003.

In 2022, Cimatu became the subject of an intimidation lawsuit case in which former Agriculture Secretary Manny Piñol accused him of Cyberlibel for a facebook post about Piñol's income increasing significantly at the time of a bird flu outbreak on the island of Luzon. A local court convicted Cimatu, prompting support from Philippine Press organizations, the National Union of Journalists of the Philippines, and the Philippines' own Commission on Human Rights. Philippine Senator Risa Hontiveros likewise filed Senate Bill No. 1593, which decriminalizes libel, refrencing Cimatu's case in gathering support for the bill,which was also refiled by partylist representative Leila de Lima in 2023.

== See also ==
- Baguio City
- Don Carlos Palanca Memorial Awards for Literature
