= Rodel Tapaya =

Filipino painter (born 1980)

- Born: Rodel Tapaya Garcia; 1980 (age 45–46); Montalban, Rizal, Philippines
- Education: University of the Philippines, Parsons School of Design, New York University of Art and Design, University of Helsinki
- Known for: Painter
- Notable work: Cane of Kabunian, numbered but cannot be counted, Deconstruction, Donsadat And The Magic Dog, The Banquet, The Giant Watermelon, The Wedding
- Movement: Southeast Asian contemporary painting

Rodel Tapaya (born 1980) is a Filipino painter.

== Biography ==
Rodel Tapaya was born in 1980, in Montalban, Rizal, Philippines. He studied painting at the University of the Philippines College of Fine Arts, University of Helsinki and at Parsons School of Design. In 2011, he won the Signature Art Prize given by the Asia-Pacific Breweries Foundation and the Singapore Art Museum.

=== Work ===
Tapaya's works recurrently depict narratives embedded in Filipino cultural history. His current works are marked by labyrinthine patterns and recurring characters that transmit scenes and figures from folk stories in his pictorial world. He studied Painting and Drawing at the Parsons School of Design and the University of Art and Design in Helsinki, Finland.
