= Lindenholzhausen =

- Borough of Limburg an der Lahn
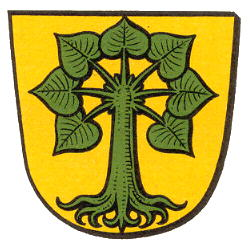
- Coat of arms
- Interactive map of Lindenholzhausen
- Location within Germany Location within Hesse
- Coordinates: 50°22′35″N 08°7′22″E
- Country: Germany
- State: Hesse
- Admin. region: Gießen
- District: Limburg-Weilburg
- Town: Limburg an der Lahn
- Founded: 772

Area
  - Total: 8.317 km^{2} (3.211 sq mi)
- Elevation: 170 m (560 ft)

Population (2020)
  - Total: 3,315
  - Density: 398.6/km^{2} (1,032/sq mi)
- Time zone: UTC+01:00 (CET)
  - Summer (DST): UTC+02:00 (CEST)
- Postal codes: 65551
- Dialling codes: 06431
- Vehicle registration: LM
- Website: http://www.limburg.de

Lindenholzhausen (in local dialect "Hollesse") has been a borough (Ortsbezirk) of the Town of Limburg an der Lahn, Hesse, Germany since 1972. The population on 30 June 2020 was 3,315. Lindenholzhausen has an average elevation of 170 metres above sea level and an area of 831.7 hectares (ha), making it the largest district of Limburg an der Lahn, the others being Ahlbach, Blumenrod, Dietkirchen, Eschhofen, Linter, Offheim and Staffel.

== Etymology ==
During its history, the village has had numerous variations of its current name: Hultshusin prope Ribesangin (1305), Holtshusen bi Ribesangen (1306), Holtzhusen prope Lympurg, Hulzhusen zo der lynden, and Lynnenholzhausen.

The name Lindenholzhausen is a compound noun consisting of the nouns Holz, Hausen, and Linde. Holz, meaning timber^{BrE}/lumber^{AE}, probably originates from the Old Saxon holt meaning "forest, wood, timber/lumber" and the Old High German hulta also meaning "timber/lumber". The noun Hausen, only found as a suffix in place names (the verb hausen means "to dwell, to reside") in standard German, probably originates from the Old High German husen meaning hamlet or settlement. The compounds holtshusen, hultshusen, and similar would mean "hamlet/settlement (in the clearing) in/[at the edge of] the forest/wood". Linde, meaning lime^{BrE}/linden^{AE} tree, would extend the compound Holzhausen to mean "hamlet/settlement with the lime/linden tree (in the clearing) in/[at the edge of] the forest/wood".

This method uniquely identifies the village within the whole of Germany; a query for "Holzhausen" in the online postal code index (PLZ suchen) of the German Post returns 71 results, whereas a query for "Lindenholzhausen" returns just one. As if rendering homage to its distinguishing nature, a single lime/linden tree is depicted on the escutcheon of the village's coat of arms. This was the Gerichtslinde of the area. These were several trees in a sequence through the centuries, the last of which was felled by lightning in the 1930s. A new linden was planted after WWII, but not at its historic site, which, however, still bears the field name ("Flurname"). The village's current coat of arms is based on the justice court seal of 1486: in gold a stylized, green linden tree with roots.

Lindenholzhausen was one of the seats of a Grafschaftsgerichts ("countship justice court") of the Counts of Diez. It is mentioned in the sources in 1342 and 1485. The Kirchspielgericht ("parish justice court") of Lindenholzhausen (denoted thus in 1486) was a civil and criminal court. Its jurisdiction encompassed Lindenholzhausen (where the courthouse was situated) along with Eschhofen and Dietkirchen (now boroughs of Limburg an der Lahn), and the villages of Rübsangen, Vele, Mailstatt (near Eschhofen), and Kreuch (within the Brückenvorstadt, or "bridgehead settlement", of Limburg), all four of which no longer exist.

== Location and infrastructure ==
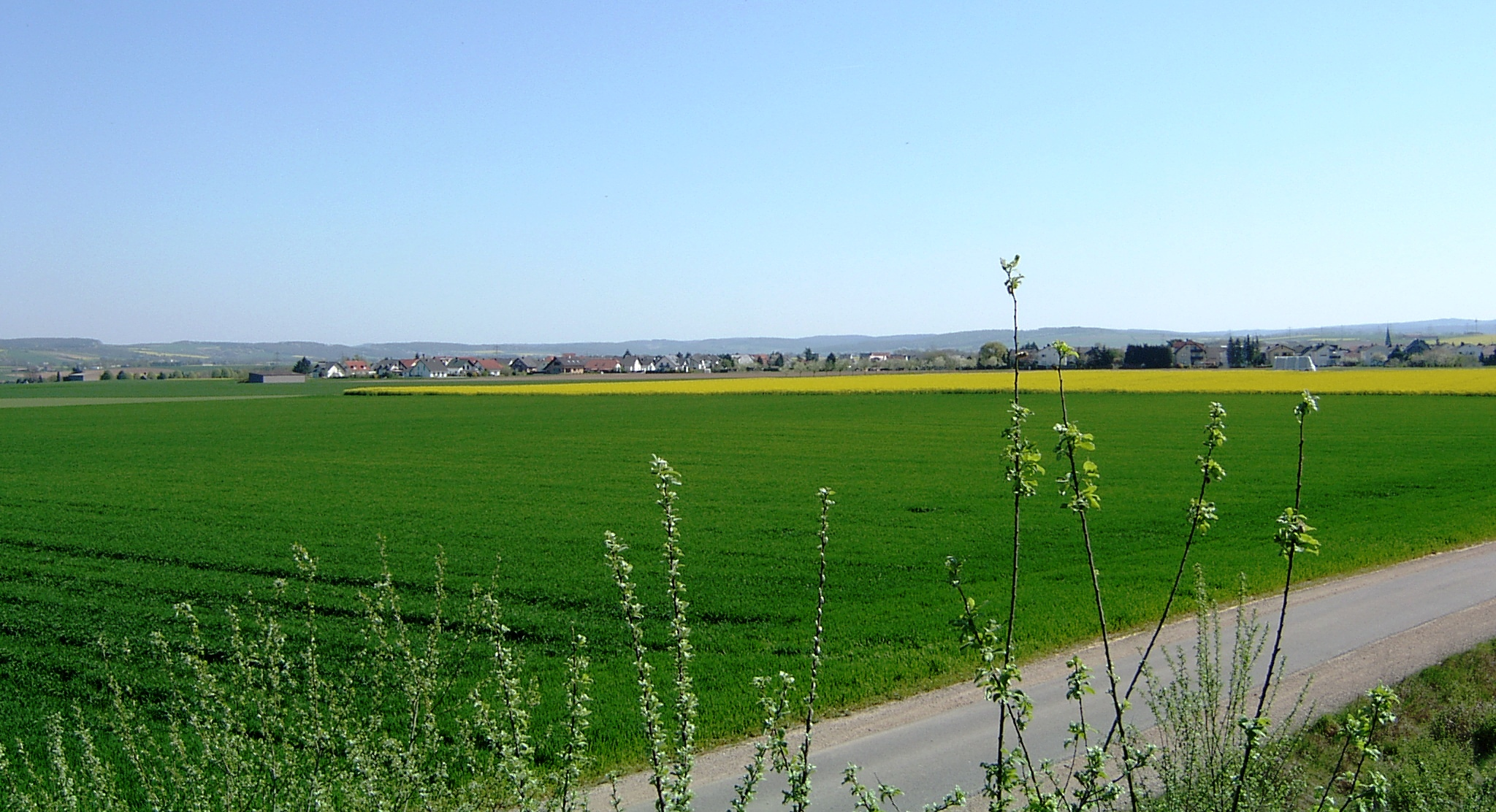
Village skyline from the west.

Lindenholzhausen lies to the southeast of Limburg an der Lahn approximately three kilometres (1 7/8 miles) from town limits. The village is two kilometres (1 1/4 miles) southeast of exit 43 ("Limburg-Süd") of the German Motorway A3. Lindenholzhausen is traversed by a historical trading route, now a Federal road called the B8. In addition, Lindenholzhausen is connected by a secondary road depicted as the "L 3484" with the Bundesstraße B 417, the federal road connecting the cities of Wiesbaden and Limburg an der Lahn.

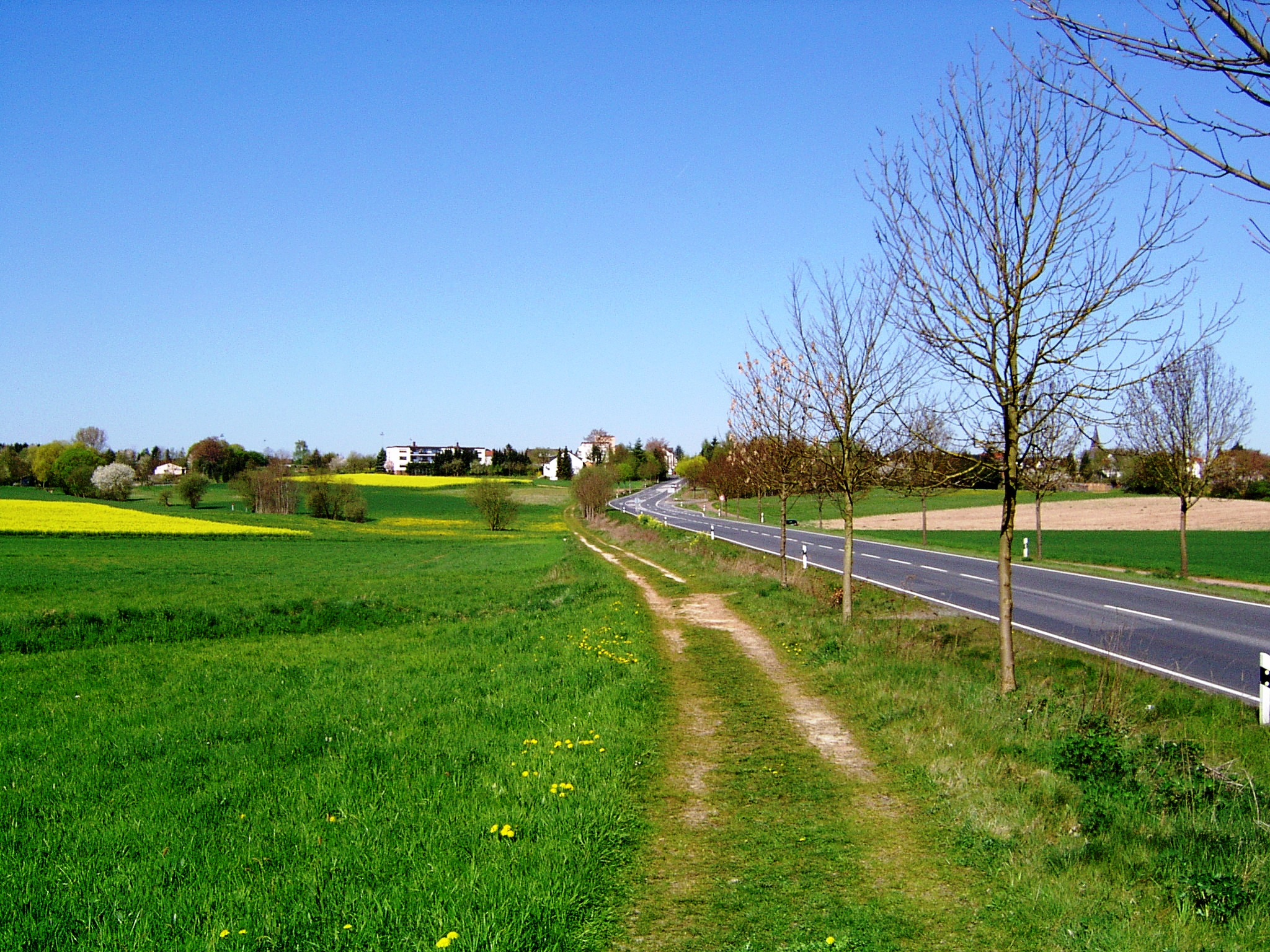
Village skyline from the southeast.

The Inter-City Express Station Limburg-Süd, which is located about half-way between Limburg an der Lahn and Lindenholzhausen and opened for operations on 1 August 2002, provides access to the Cologne-Frankfurt high-speed rail line. The Inter-City Express connects the district of Limburg-Weilburg with the city of Cologne (55 minutes), the Cologne-Bonn Airport (40 minutes), the city of Frankfurt (35 minutes) and Frankfurt Airport (20 minutes). In addition, Lindenholzhausen station is a local station on the Main-Lahn Railway, which connects the village to Frankfurt and the towns and villages in the vicinity. Despite these convenient road and rail connections, Lindenholzhausen has managed to retain a predominantly rural character.

== History ==
Lindenholzhausen was first documented in 772 as "Holzhusen", in a gift document to the monastery of Lorsch/Ried by the Robertinian Rachilde, which dated on August 12,772. By 1305, the villages of Rübsangen und Vele were incorporated into the district of Lindenholzhausen. By 1532, Lindenholzhausen had a population of 310. Being on the route between Cologne and Frankfurt and near the route between Mainz and Siegen, Lindenholzhausen suffered during the Thirty Years' War (1618–1648) from pillage, famine and plague. By 1697, the village had a population of 382.

In 1750, a serious fire destroyed 93 buildings. Between 1768 and 1780, the trading route between Koblenz and Frankfurt (am Main) was built (now the B8). In 1801, another serious fire destroyed 63 smallholdings together with their harvested crops and left two thirds of the population homeless and destitute. Considering the entirety of its 1,235 years of existence, Lindenholzhausen has been rather uneventful from an international viewpoint.

== Germany's largest village of vocalists ==
Lindenholzhausen is renowned for its choirs. Although the village [as of 2007] has no more than 3,400 residents, it has a remarkable number of 11 choirs, even though some of these are assigned to the same associations. The independent choirs are the Cäcilia, the ensemble vocale lindenholzhausen, the Harmonie and the Church Choir. The Cäcilia comprises a male, a female and a youth choir, a Pop and Jazz choir, a young choir and the "Schrägen Acht" (a unit of the male choir that performs mostly at local events and whose name plays on the ambiguous German adjective "schräg" implying both mischievous and off-key; the "Acht" (eight) designates its headcount when it was founded in 1968 and has remained despite its current (2007) headcount of seventeen). The Harmonie comprises The Male Choir, The Young Harmonists, and The Small Choir.

Throughout the years, these choirs have won multiple national and international prizes and rank among the best amateur choirs in the world. Accordingly, Lindenholzhausen is often referred to by the press as "Germany's Largest Village of Vocalists". Although local events include the annual Funfair (German: "Kirmes") and associations' anniversaries (German: "Vereinsjubiläen"), the choral and folklore festivals remain by far the village's major events with participants and visitors totalling between 10,000 and 20,000 from all around the world.

== Mineral spring ==
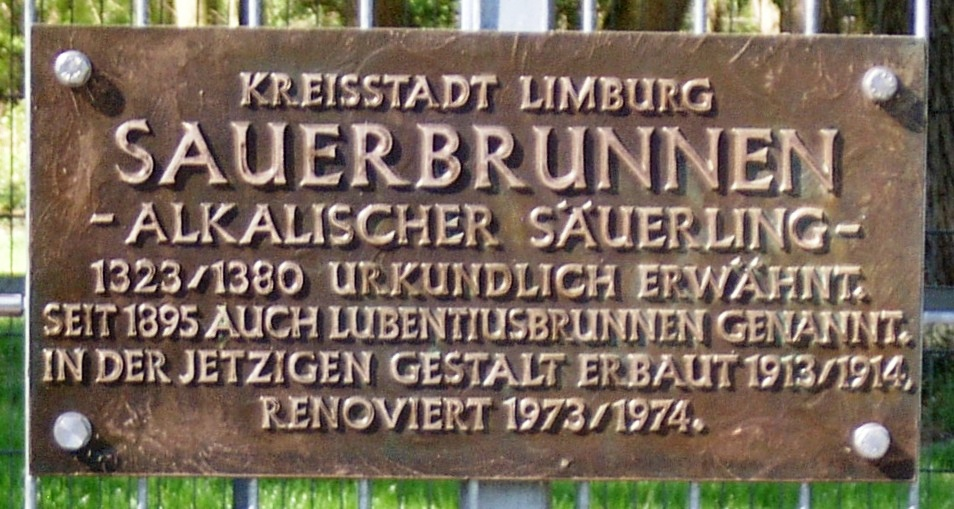
Nameplate.

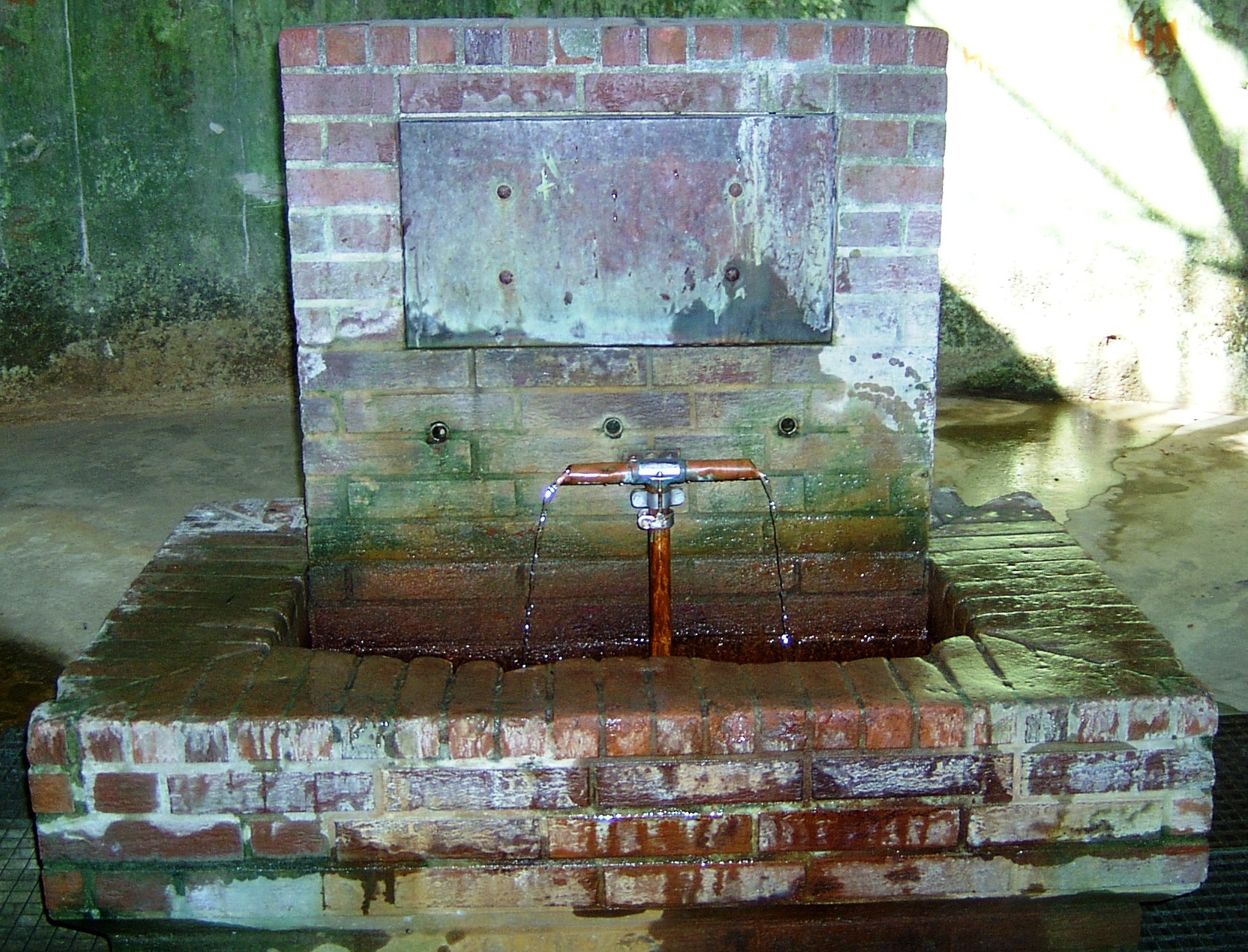
Spring front.

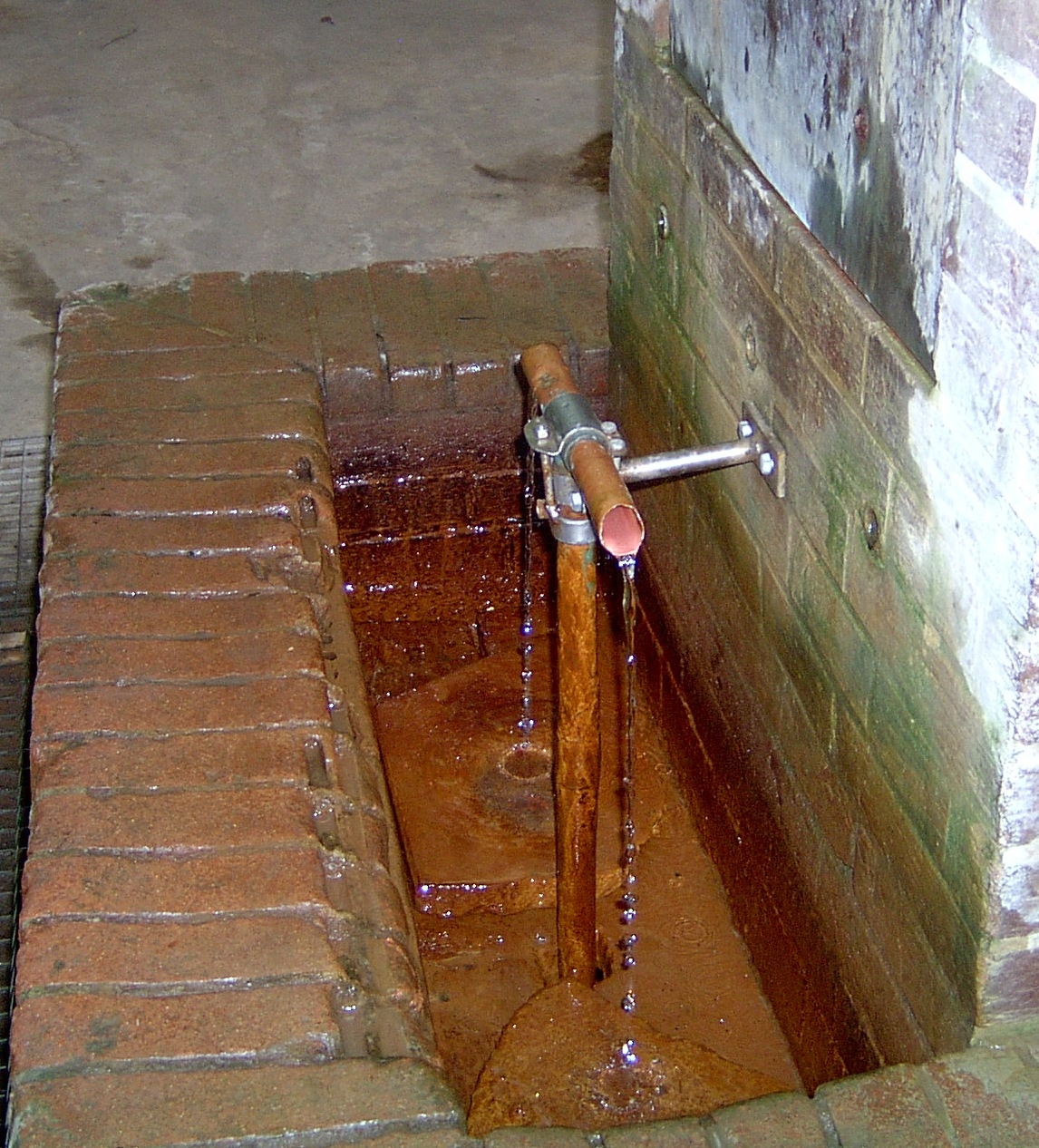
Spring side.

Lindenholzhausen has the fortune of having its own mineral spring, known in standard German as the Sauerbrunnen and in local dialect as the Sauborn.

Although documented in 1323, it was first put to commercial use in 1894, when Baron August von Rottkay leased the spring from the parish of Lindenholzhausen, named it the Lubentiusbrunnen (Brunnen = spring, well), and sold its produce as "superb, savory and salubrious table and medicinal water" ("hervorragendes, wohlschmeckendes und bekömmliches Tafel- und Medicinal-Wasser").

Its commercial use continued under different owners until about 1914. Today, the spring is back in municipal possession and the citizens of Lindenholzhausen happily exercise their right to help themselves to "their" free mineral water. A connection between the consumption of the spring water and the singing has yet to be established.

== Historical hourstone ==
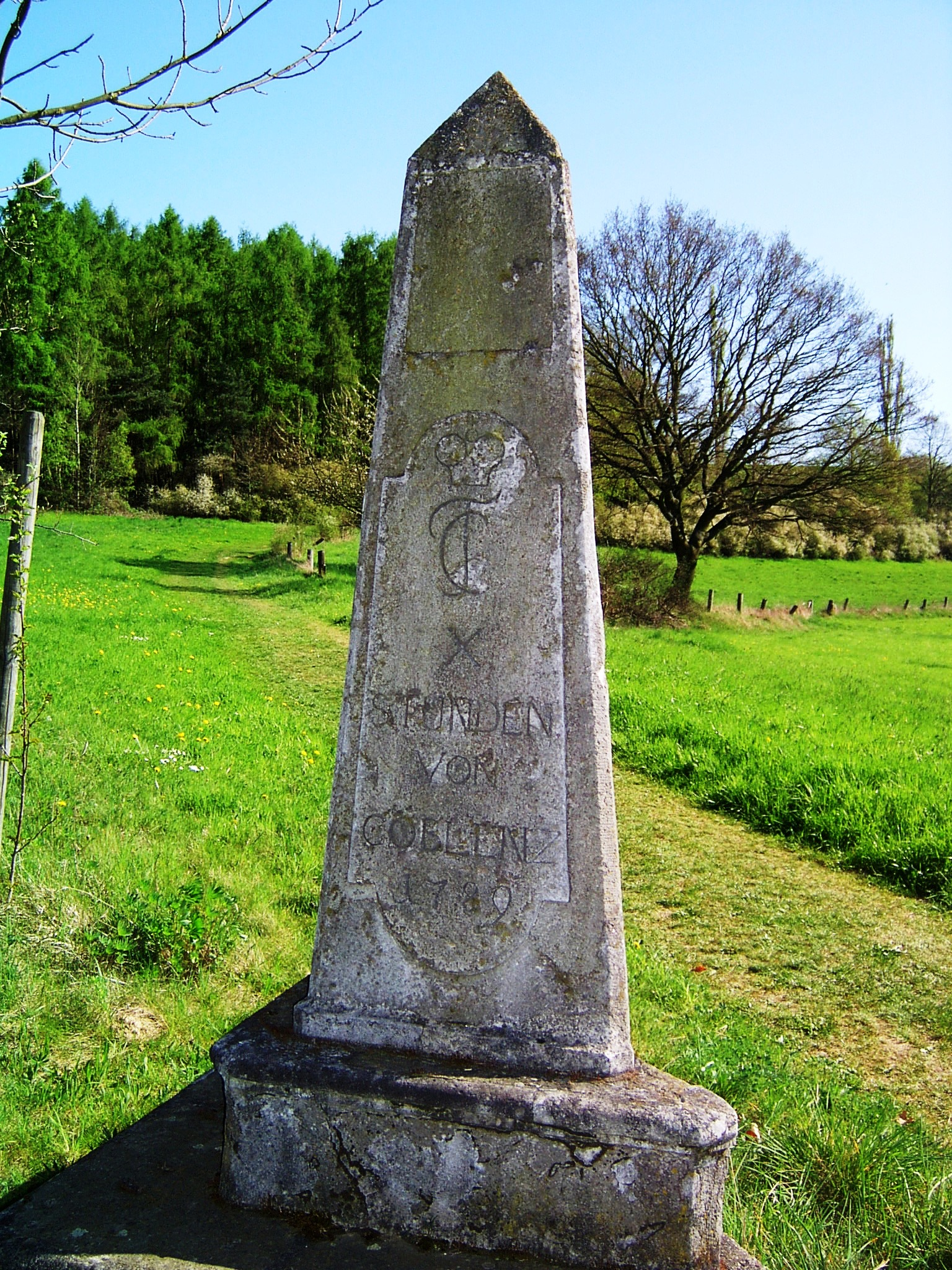
Hourstone from the northwest.

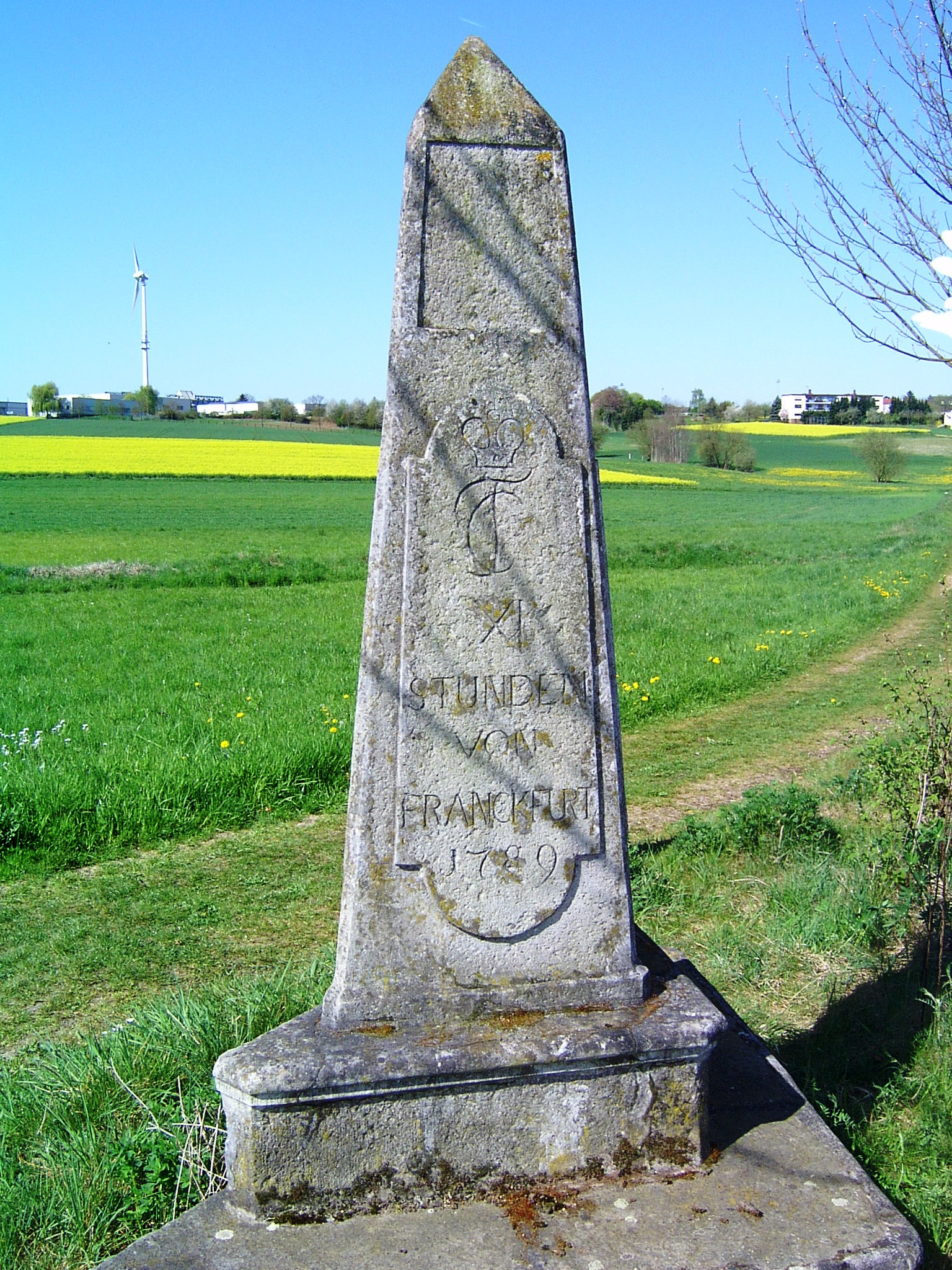
Hourstone from the east.

About a 1/2 km (5/16 mile) southeast of Lindenholzhausen beside the B8 is a historical hourstone (Stundenstein). As opposed to a milestone, an hourstone informs travellers that they are a specific number of hours away from a particular location. Travellers of the day knew the time designated referred to a fully loaded cart being drawn by a single horse. This particular hourstone informs travellers that they are X (10) hours from Coblenz and XI (11) hours from Franckfurt. The 21-hour duration of the 105 km (65 5/8 mile) journey from Koblenz to Frankfurt (am Main) implies that the average speed of a fully loaded horse-drawn cart was between 4 and 6 km/h (2 1/2 and 3 3/4 mph).

This hourstone is one of 14 that were erected between Koblenz and Würges (a district of Bad Camberg) following a decree issued in 1789 (date on the hourstone) by the last Bishop and Prince-elector of Trier, Clement Wenceslaus of Saxony. Although only 8 of the initial 14 hourstones remain, these monuments of Germany's more distant past are not under a preservation order.

The inscription "CT" beneath the symbolised Elector's Crown stands for "Chur Trier", now known as "Kurtrier" (Electorate of Trier). The route from "Coblenz" to "Frankfurt" led through different territories, including the Electorate of Trier, the Principality of Nassau-Oranien, the Principality of Nassau-Usingen, the Electorate of Mainz, and the Imperial City of Frankfurt and it was not uncommon for a territory to have its own system of length units. In order to avoid laborious conversions between the different systems, the down-to-earth dimension of "average distance covered by a fully loaded horse-drawn cart per" hour was introduced, which was much more useful to the common traveller of the day. It also had the advantage that speed variations due to mountain crests and valleys could be incorporated.
