= Pilipinas Got Talent season 7 =

Season of television series

Pilipinas Got Talent
- Season 7
- Promotional poster featuring hosts Robi Domingo and Cantiveros and judges Garcia, Bernardo, Eugene Domingo, and Pangilinan
- Hosted by: Robi Domingo; Melai Cantiveros
- Judges: Freddie M. Garcia; Kathryn Bernardo; Eugene Domingo; Donny Pangilinan
- Winner: Cardong Trumpo
- Runner-up: Femme MNL
- Finals venue: Solaire Resort, Entertainment City, Parañaque
- Companion show: PGT Exclusives (online)
- No. of episodes: 25 (Note: The show did not air on April 19, 2025, due to Holy Week special programming from Maundy Thursday until Black Saturday.)

Release
- Original network: Kapamilya Channel
- Original release: March 29 – June 22, 2025

Season chronology
- ← Previous; Season 6

The seventh season of Pilipinas Got Talent premiered on Kapamilya Channel on March 29, 2025, with simulcasts on A2Z and TV5. It marked the show's return after a seven-year hiatus, following the conclusion of its sixth season in 2018, and is the first season to air since the shutdown of ABS-CBN in 2020. The judging panel is composed of Freddie M. Garcia, Kathryn Bernardo, Eugene Domingo, and Donny Pangilinan, with Robi Domingo and Melai Cantiveros serving as hosts. The season ended on June 22, 2025, with Ricardo Cadavero (a.k.a. Cardong Trumpo) crowned the winner of the season, with hip-hop dance group Femme MNL as the runner-up and magician Carl Quion in third place.

Cardong Trumpo's victory marked the third consecutive win by a non-singing act, following Kristel de Catalina's win in the previous season. It is also the first time a non-dancer has won the show, and the first time a non-golden buzzer act has won since the feature was introduced in season 5.

== Development ==
On March 29, 2018, a month before the finale of the sixth season, ABS-CBN announced the initial audition dates for the seventh season. However, despite the announcement, the season did not air as planned. The network's shutdown in 2020, and COVID-19 pandemic that same year and its aftermath, contributed to the delay.

In a presentation held on November 23, 2022, at Sofitel Philippine Plaza Manila, TV5 initially announced the new season of Pilipinas Got Talent as part of its 2023 programming. However, the planned season was subsequently delayed. Later, on October 16, 2024, ABS-CBN announced the show's return and the upcoming commencement of online auditions for the seventh season, indicating the show's return. On December 15, 2024, during Shine Kapamilya, Tulong-Tulong Ngayong Pasko: The ABS-CBN Christmas Special 2024, the show's return was confirmed, with the lineup confirmed to follow in a forthcoming announcement.

=== Judges and hosts ===
Judges and host of Pilipinas Got Talent season 7

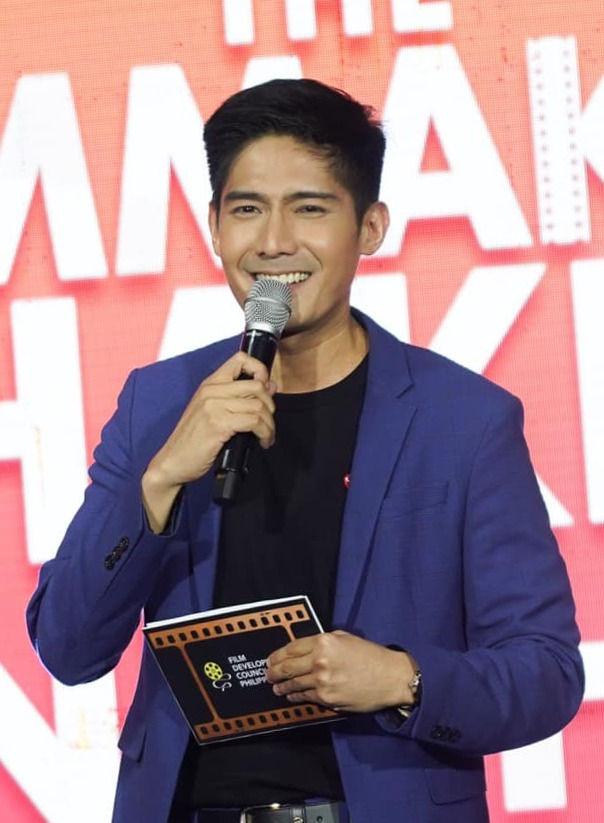
Robi Domingo (host)

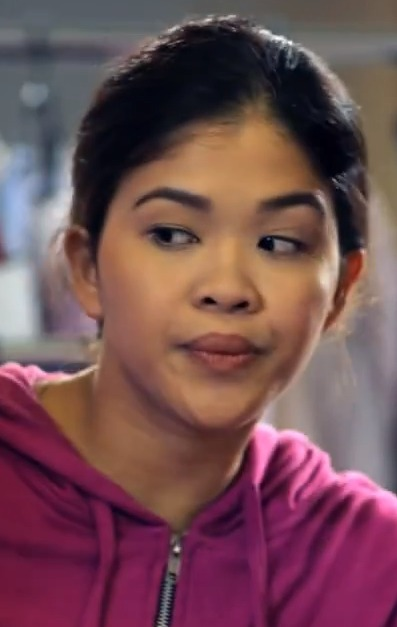
Melai Cantiveros (host)

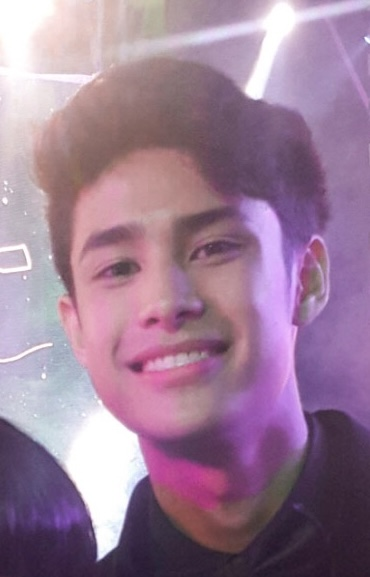
Donny Pangilinan

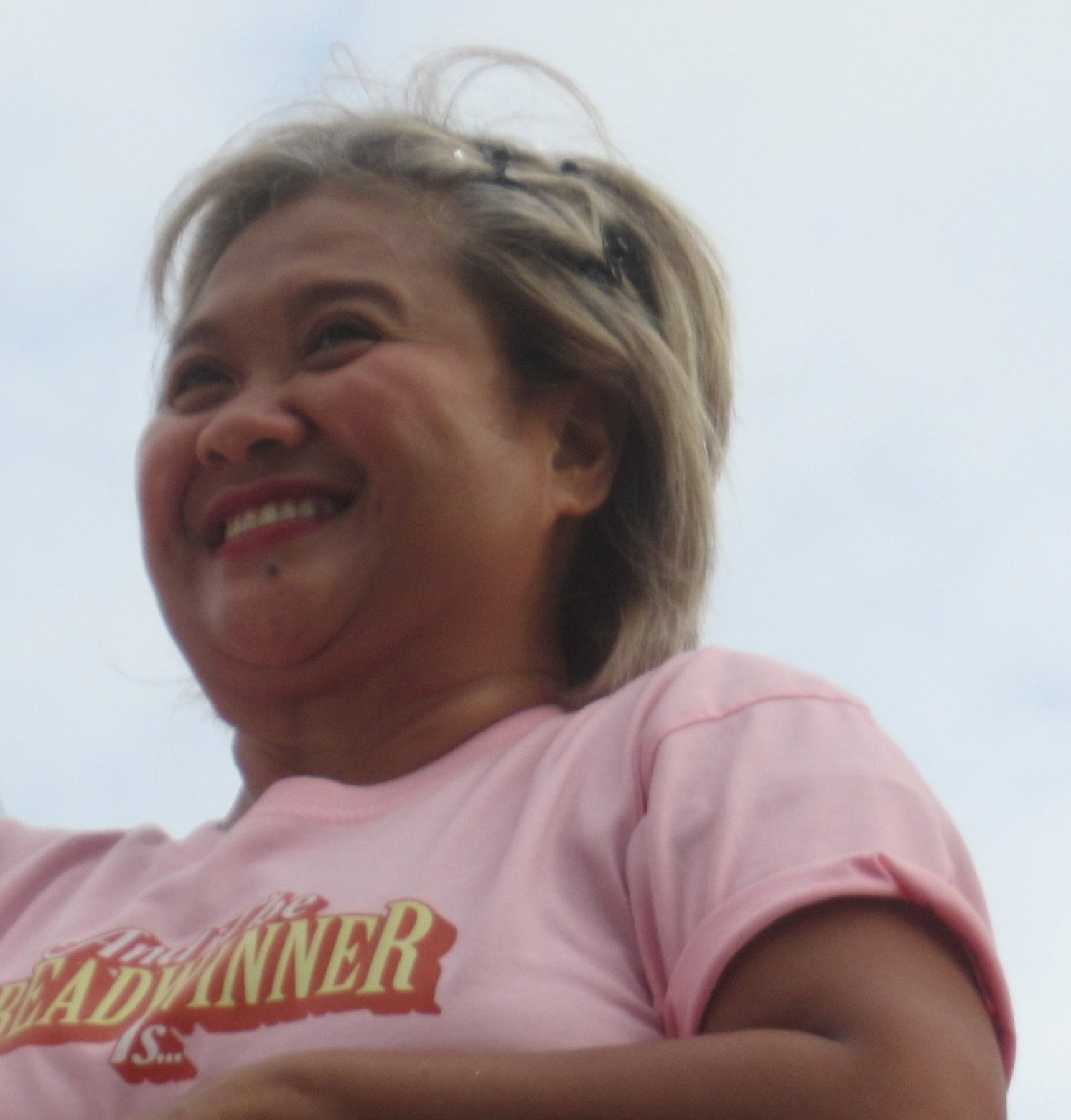
Eugene Domingo

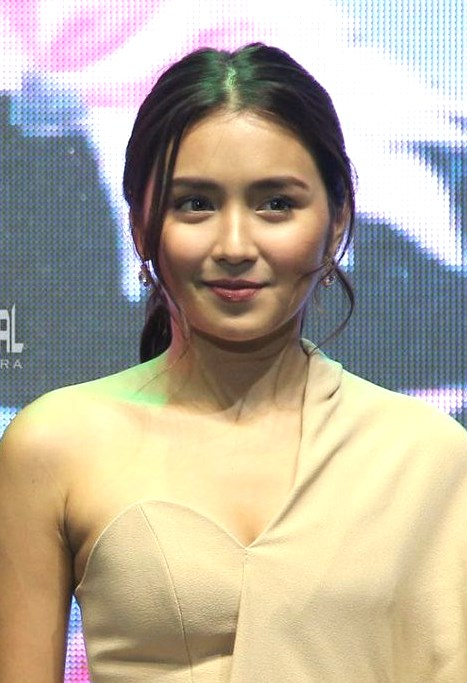
Kathryn Bernardo

On February 21, 2025, ABS-CBN revealed the new panel of judges for the season. From the judges from the sixth season, only Freddie M. Garcia returned, continuing his streak of appearances from the show's inaugural season. Robin Padilla, Angel Locsin, and Vice Ganda all left the panel, with actors Kathryn Bernardo, Eugene Domingo, and Donny Pangilinan taking their places. Robi Domingo and Melai Cantiveros were confirmed as the new hosts, replacing Billy Crawford and Toni Gonzaga.

=== Broadcast ===
At a media conference on March 19, 2025, it was announced that Pilipinas Got Talent would also simulcast on Kapamilya Channel, TV5 and A2Z, while it will also be streamed live through ABS-CBN's Kapamilya Online Live. The conference were also attended by the four judges and the new hosts. It was also announced that the new season will premiere on March 29, 2025.

=== Companion show ===
During commercial breaks of the televised broadcast, PGT Exclusives, an online companion program, streams concurrently on Kapamilya Online Live. Hosted by Wize Estabillo and Lorraine Galvez, this segment features supplementary content, including behind-the-scenes footage and contestant interviews, distinct from the primary television broadcast.

== Auditions ==
Cities in the Philippines where the auditions were held.

Online auditions were opened on October 17, 2024. On-ground auditions began on December 14 and ran until March 2025.

On-ground auditions of Pilipinas Got Talent season 7
Date	Venue	Location	Refs.
December 7, 2024	City Hall Building	San Jose, Nueva Ecija	
December 14, 2024	ABS-CBN Center Road	Quezon City	
January 19 & 25, 2025	ABS-CBN Center Road	Quezon City	
February 9, 2025	Albuera Municipal Gym	Albuera, Leyte	
March 6, 2025	Handuraw Pizza	Mandaue, Cebu	
March 7–8, 2025	LaVenue at Halal House	Davao City	
March 8, 2025	Island City Mall Activity Center	Tagbilaran, Bohol	
March 8, 2025	Camaligan River Park (The Wharf)	Camaligan, Camarines Sur	
March 21, 2025	SM City Puerto Princesa	Puerto Princesa, Palawan	
March 27, 2025	Capitol Training Center	Mamburao, Occidental Mindoro	
March 28, 2025	Municipal Town Plaza	San Jose, Occidental Mindoro	

=== Live auditions ===
Live auditions for the seventh season were conducted from February 21, 2025, to March 11, 2025, and March 18, 2025, at Studio 10 in the ABS-CBN Broadcasting Center, Quezon City. During these live auditions, auditionees were required to secure three 'yes' votes from the four judges to advance to the Judges' cull. Alternatively, a golden buzzer, activated by any of the judges or the hosts, would automatically advance the auditionee to the semi-final rounds.

== Successful auditionees ==
The following is a non-exhaustive list of auditionees during the Live auditions that either received a Golden Buzzer (marked with the symbol) or were confirmed on the program to have advanced after receiving at least three "yes" votes from the judges.

A total of ninety-six acts had been aired on television, with seventy-three of those acts moving on to the next round, including five that received a golden buzzer from the judges and hosts. Note that the ages listed below are as of the stage at which the auditions were recorded. Some of the acts do not reveal their ages during auditions.

Hosts Robi Domingo and Melai Cantiveros were the first to press the golden buzzer for dance group Femme MNL, while Eugene Domingo was the first judge to use her golden buzzer for fire balancing act Jeffrey Bangcaya. Freddie M. Garcia was the second judge to use his golden buzzer for the light dance group Fire Motion Lightrix. Kathryn Bernardo was the third judge to use her golden buzzer for acrobatic dancer Jasmine Flores. Donny Pangilinan was the fourth and the last judge to use his golden buzzer for rock singer Esay Kirstin Belanio.

Act names in bold indicate that they were chosen for the live shows in the Judges' Cull (including acts who received the golden buzzer); italics indicates a returning act from previous seasons, while an asterisk beside their name (*) indicates that the act had auditioned outside of the studio (otherwise known as an outdoor act).

Note that the acts listed here are those whose auditions were fully aired on television, with the full results of their respective auditions displayed.

- A and J AcroDuo, Acrobatic Duo from Davao del Norte
- Abril Lata, 36, Comedy Act from Quezon City
- AENHS Bench Cheerers*, Bench Cheering Group from Aparri
- Anthony Andres, Comedy Act from Rizal
- Ariel and Ryan Acrobat Duo*27 & 34, Acrobatic Duo from Santo Tomas, Batangas
- Automatic Dance Crew, Hip-hop Dance Group from Sampaloc, Manila
- Belle's Duo, Stand-Up Comedy Duo from Leyte and Samar
- Bene & Jr. Constaños, Harp Players from Cebu
- **Brayt Box Duo**, Comedy and Beatboxing Duo from General Santos and Sarangani
- BINI Mini (Note: The youngest member of the child group BINI Mini is six years old; the age of the oldest member was not disclosed.), Girl Group from Olongapo
- Bon Joker, Magician from Rodriguez, Rizal
- **Cardong Trumpo**, 55, Trumpo Spinner from Dasmariñas, Cavite
- **Carl Quion**, 33, Magician from Pampanga
- **Chikletz Family**, Hip-hop Dance Group from Silang, Cavite
- CYA Moms (Note: The oldest member of the dance group CYA Moms is sixty-eight years old; the age of the youngest member was undisclosed.), Dance Group from Novaliches
- **Dwyne Lopeña***, 21, Bike Tricker from Tagbilaran, Bohol
- Edrian Gamboa, 23, Contortionist from Lemery, Batangas
- **Esay Kirstin Belanio**, Rock Singer from Iloilo City – Golden buzzer received from Donny Pangilinan
- **Femme MNL**, Hip-hop Dance Group from Santa Mesa, Manila – Golden buzzer received from Robi Domingo and Melai Cantiveros
- **Fire Motion Lightrix**, Light Dance Group from Cebu – Golden buzzer received from Freddie M. Garcia
- **Fuego Eterno**, Hip-hop Dance Group from Marikina
- Gingoog Pride, Dance Group from Misamis Oriental
- **Godwin Gonzales**, Magician from Iloilo City
- Hustle N' Flow, Hip-hop Dance Group from Rizal
- **Jasmine Flores**, 18, Acrobatic Dancer from Toronto, Canada – Golden buzzer received from Kathryn Bernardo
- **Jaylo and Faris**, Dancing Duo from Pampanga and Malaysia
- Jayson Rebenque, Ventriloquist from Santa Cruz, Laguna
- **Jeffrey Bangcaya***, Fire Balancer from Muntinlupa – Golden buzzer received from Eugene Domingo
- **Jessie J**, 39, Dancer from Surigao del Norte
- **Kinnarda***, Hula-Hoop Fire Dancer from Antipolo
- Lucy, 21, Drag Horror Act from Quezon City
- Mamam Boyz, Comedy Act from Mandaluyong
- **Mamhood Sounds**, Vehicle Sound Impersonator from Cotabato City
- **Manza** (Note: Manza is a returning auditionee who first appeared on the fifth season under his real name, Nique Mancha. He was eliminated on the Judges' Cull phase.), 30, Drag Aerial Balancing Act from Davao de Oro
- Maria Pinoy, 27, Chair Balancing Act from Navotas
- Mark Navarro, 20, Balancing Act from Taguig
- Nestor Carilo, 36, Singer from Taguig
- Next Level Octomix, Dancing with Jumping Rope Act Group from Caloocan
- **NDDU Gnrls*** (Note: Pronounced as NDDU Generals.), Dance Group from General Santos
- New Generation Abuyog, Hip-hop Dance Group from Abuyog, Leyte
- **Ody Sto. Domingo** (Note: Ody Sto. Domingo is a returning auditionee who first appeared on the fifth season and finished third place.), Magician from Marikina
- **Olayapanit Band**, Musical Band from Quezon
- **Owen Bofill** (Note: Owen intended to audition with his wife Shine as a duo act, but due to the latter's nodules on her vocal cords, only Owen appeared in front of the judges. Owen was later joined by his wife following the auditions. Judge Freddie M. Garcia also stated that if Owen or both of them are chosen for the live shows, they will be able to perform in the following round.), 41, Singer from Bauan, Batangas
- Pandalan Twins (Note: The Pandalan Twins are Raymart and Raymond Pandalan, twin siblings aged 27. Raymart first performed in front of the judges, and Raymond later appeared during his performance to reveal their secret as twins.), 27, Acrobatic Duo from Taguig
- Pedro Hasty Leaf (Note: At the beginning of the trio's audition, Pedro introduced himself and gave the first performance in front of the judges. Hasty and Leaf then joined Pedro in his performance and were later identified as members of the trio.), Singer and Beatboxer Trio from Las Piñas
- Raphael "RapRap" Milana, 5, Dinosaur Identification Act from Bohol
- Roger Genabe, 66, Calisthenics Act from Davao City
- **RoxBrix**, 8 & 27, Beatboxing Duo from Hagonoy, Bulacan
- Riri Ceniza, 19, Acrobatic Act from Taguig
- Robie Doll, Doll Act from Iloilo
- Rose Conde, Singer from Rizal
- Sethierre Duo, Dancesport Duo from Baguio
- Sining Tanglawan*, Dance Group from San Jose del Monte, Bulacan
- Spice Moms, 56–67, Singing Girl Group from Caloocan
- **The Amazing Duo**, 22 & 27, Contemporary Acrobatic Duo from Laguna
- **The Amazing Twisters**, Pole Balancing Group from Angeles City
- Tristan with Milo and Ovaltine, 10 & 3 (Note: Ages of dogs Milo and Ovaltine, respectively. Tristan, the dogs' owner, did not reveal his age during the audition.), Dog Trick Act from Antipolo
- V4F, 9–11, Singing Group from Quezon City
- Villanueva Twins, 25, Guitar Exhibitionists from Bulacan
- X Team Riders*, Motorcycle Exhibitionists from Malolos, Bulacan

=== Partially documented acts ===
Due to broadcast time constraints, some acts that passed the audition stage may have been edited out entirely and are not included. In other cases, the outcomes of certain auditions may be partially documented, with only one or two "yes" votes being known. Judges typically buzz out and vote against some of the partially documented acts and thus are not listed here.

One notable contestant is Jepthah Callitong, a semi-finalist from season 6, re-auditioned with a magic act, but did not garner enough votes to proceed to the next round.

The acts that were partially documented in the show but are known to receive three or all four approval votes are as follows:

- Ariel Daluraya, Singer from Valenzuela (Note: Ariel's interview with the online hosts premiered on PGT Exclusives on May 3, 2025, so he can be defined as a partially documented act. However, his audition was one of the final four to be aired on May 18.)
- Angel Jade Bedico, Singer from Davao City
- Baila Trio, Aerial Cube Trio from Davao City
- Daña Ross, Ballet & Singer from Tagbilaran, Bohol
- FamiliAcapella, Acapella Group from Pampanga
- Jared Pascual, Piano Player from Nueva Vizcaya
- KT Power Duo, Singing Duo from Nueva Ecija
- Mhax Castro, Drummer from La Union
- Parcen Guards, Dance Group from Parañaque
- Ruthless Comrades, Hip-hop Dance Group from Taytay, Rizal
- The Destroyers, Pop & Tut Dance Group from Davao de Oro
- Sabrina, Singer from Batangas
- Shammah Elegado, Violin Player from Zambales

== Judges' cull ==
The Judges' cull aired on May 18, 2025, the day of the final auditions episode. Seventy-three acts had gotten at least three approval votes from the judges. Apart from the five Golden Acts, the judges chose nineteen acts to advance to the live semi-finals, bringing the total to twenty-four. This season currently holds the record for the fewest number of semifinalists in a season.

Sofronio Vasquez, winner of The Voice US season 26, made a brief appearance during the episode.

=== Top 24 result summary ===
Legend:

- Winner
- Runner-up
- Finalist
- Semi-finalist (lost judges' vote)
- Golden Buzzer Act

Top 24 of Pilipinas Got Talent season 7
Name of act	Age(s) (Note: Note that some of the ages may be inaccurate.)	Genre	Act	Hometown	Semifinal Week	Result
Cardong Trumpo (Ricardo Cadavero)	55	Variety	Trompo spinner	Dasmariñas, Cavite	3	Winner
Femme MNL	15–30	Dance	Hip-hop dance group	Santa Mesa, Manila	1	Runner-up
Carl Quion	33	Variety	Magician	Pampanga	4	Third place
Manza	30	Variety	Drag aerial balancer	Davao de Oro	4	Fourth place
Jeffrey Bangcaya	33	Variety	Fire balancer	Muntinlupa	2	Fifth place
Jessie J	29	Variety	Contemporary dancer	Surigao del Norte	2	Sixth place
NDDU Gnrls	16–35	Dance	Hip-hop dance group	General Santos	3	Seventh place
Ody Sto. Domingo	40	Variety	Magician	Marikina	1	Eighth place
Fire Motion Lightrix	23–37	Dance	Light dance group	Cebu	4	Eliminated
Chikletz Family	15–28	Dance	Hip-hop dance group	Silang, Cavite	4	Eliminated
Jasmine Flores	18	Dance	Acrobatic dancer	Toronto, Canada	4	Eliminated
Mamhood Sounds	17	Variety	Vehicle sound impersonator	Cotabato City	4	Eliminated
Esay Kirstin Belanio	19	Sing	Rock singer	Iloilo City	3	Eliminated
Godwin Gonzales	19–43 (Note: Multiple ages were associated with Godwin, his assistant, and his daughter, who accompanied him during his audition.)	Variety	Magician	Iloilo City	3	Eliminated
Jaylo and Faris	27 & 28	Dance	Dancing duo	Pampanga / Malaysia	3	Eliminated
RoxBrix	8 & 27	Variety	Beatboxing duo	Hagonoy, Bulacan	3	Eliminated
Dwyne Lopeña	21	Variety	Bike tricks	Tagbilaran, Bohol	2	Eliminated
Brayt Box Duo	24 & 29	Variety	Beatboxing and comedy duo	General Santos and Sarangani	2	Eliminated
Kinnarda	25	Variety	Hula-hoop fire dancer	Antipolo	2	Eliminated
Olayapanit Band	26–43	Sing	Musical band	Quezon	2	Eliminated
Fuego Eterno	18–27	Dance	Hip-hop dance group	Marikina	1	Eliminated
Owen Bofill	41	Sing	Singer	Bauan, Batangas	1	Eliminated
The Amazing Duo	22 & 27	Variety	Contemporary acrobatic duo	Laguna	1	Eliminated
The Amazing Twisters	37–38	Dance	Pole balancing group	Angeles City	1	Eliminated

== Semifinals ==
The live semifinals commenced on May 24, 2025, and lasted for four weeks until June 15, 2025, on ABS-CBN Studio 10 for indoor shows, and Sgt. Esguerra Ave. in front of ABS-CBN Broadcasting Center for outdoor shows. The twenty-four semi-finalists competed for eight slots in the grand finals.

For four weeks, six semi-finalists will perform once a week. The first four acts would perform on Saturdays, while the remaining two will perform on Sundays. Voting opens online once all acts have performed. Two of the six acts—one chosen by the judges (bottom two of the top 3) and one by the public (with the most votes)—will advance to the grand finals. In the event of a tie, the act with the higher number of public votes will be the second grand finalist.

Legend:

- Won the public vote
- Won the judges' vote
- Lost the judges' vote
- Golden Buzzer Act
- Buzzed out
- Judges' choice

=== Week 1 (May 24 & 25) ===
At the end of the week, Ody Sto. Domingo and Femme MNL were named the first two grand finalists.

Episode information:

- Venue: ABS-CBN Studio 10
- Episode hashtags: #PGT7FirstSemiFinals (May 24), #PGT7FirstResultsNight (May 25)
- Guest performance: BGYO

Week 1 semifinals results
Contestant	Order	Act	Buzzes and judges' votes				Percentage	Result
Contestant	Order	Act	FMG	Kathryn	Eugene	Donny	Percentage	Result
Femme MNL	1	Hip-hop dance group			–		16.14%	Advanced
Owen Bofill	2	Singer	–	–	–	–	7.86%	Eliminated
The Amazing Duo	3	Contemporary acrobatic duo	–	–	–	–	10.17%	Eliminated
The Amazing Twisters	4	Pole balancing group	–	–	–	–	5.02%	Eliminated
Fuego Eterno	5	Hip-hop dance group	–	–		–	11.67%	Eliminated
Ody Sto. Domingo	6	Magician	–	–	–	–	49.14%	Advanced

=== Week 2 (May 31 & June 1) ===
Host Robi Domingo revealed on the May 25 live episode that this semi-final week will be held outside of Studio 10, at the ABS-CBN Broadcasting Center, located at Sgt. Esguerra Avenue corner Mother Ignacia Avenue in South Triangle, Quezon City.

Due to inclement weather on Saturday, the first four performers for this semi-final week were pre-recorded. As a result, the judges did not use their buzzers for the first four performances, which are not included in the table below; instead, they watched the performances on a monitor and commented during the live broadcast inside the lobby of ABS-CBN Broadcasting Center. Meanwhile, the last two performers performed live, and the judges sat at the table for the Sunday episode as the weather improved.

Furthermore, it was revealed that actor Gerald Anderson made a guest appearance on Brayt Box Duo's taped performance, which was not shown on Sunday's episode because the weather had improved and the act had performed live. His supposed appearance was to promote his upcoming crime-thriller-mystery drama, Sins of the Father.

At the end of the week, Jeffrey Bangcaya and Jessie J were named the third and fourth grand finalists.

Episode information:

- Venue: ABS-CBN Broadcasting Center
- Episode hashtags: #PGT7SecondSemiFinals (May 31), #PGT7SecondResultsNight (June 1)
- Guest performances: Dance groups Mastermind (season 5 grand finalist) and Nocturnal Dance Company (season 6 grand finalist)

Week 2 semifinals results
Contestant	Order	Act	Buzzes and judges' votes				Percentage	Result
Contestant	Order	Act	FMG	Kathryn	Eugene	Donny	Percentage	Result
Olayapanit Band	1	Musical band	–	–	–	–	6.30%	Eliminated
Dwyne Lopena	2	Bike tricks	–	–	–	–	7.80%	Eliminated
Jessie J	3	Contemporary dancer					14.42%	Advanced
Kinnarda	4	Hula-hoop fire dancer	–	–	–	–	3.92%	Eliminated
Brayt Box Duo	5	Beatboxing and comedy duo	–	–	–	–	3.41%	Eliminated
Jeffrey Bangcaya	6	Fire balancer	–	–	–	–	64.15%	Advanced

=== Week 3 (June 7 & 8) ===
At the end of the week, Cardong Trumpo and NDDU Gnrls were named the fifth and sixth grand finalists. This week also saw a tie in the judges' vote, causing the second grand finalist from this round to be determined by public vote.

Episode information:

- Venue: ABS-CBN Studio 10
- Episode hashtags: #PGT7ThirdSemiFinals (June 7), #PGT7ThirdResultsNight (June 8)
- Guest performances: El Gamma Penumbra (season 3 grand finalist and Asia's Got Talent season 1 grand winner) and Marcelito Pomoy (season 2 grand winner and America's Got Talent: The Champions season 2 grand finalist)

Week 3 semifinals results
Contestant	Order	Act	Buzzes and judges' votes				Percentage	Result
Contestant	Order	Act	FMG	Kathryn	Eugene	Donny	Percentage	Result
NDDU Gnrls	1	Hip-hop dance group	–			–	3.40%	Advanced
Godwin Gonzales	2	Magician	–	–	–	–	0.42%	Eliminated
RoxBrix	3	Beatboxing duo	–	–	–	–	0.61%	Eliminated
Esay Kirstin Belanio	4	Rock singer		–	–		2.13%	Eliminated
Jaylo and Faris	5	Dancing duo	–	–	–	–	1.34%	Eliminated
Cardong Trumpo (Ricardo Cadavero)	6	Trompo spinner	–	–	–	–	92.11%	Advanced

=== Week 4 (June 14 & 15) ===
At the end of the week, Carl Quion and Manza were named the last two grand finalists. This week also saw another tie in the judges' vote, causing the second grand finalist from this round to be determined by public vote.

Episode information:

- Venue: ABS-CBN Studio 10
- Episode hashtags: #PGT7FourthSemiFinals (June 14), #PGT7FourthResultsNight (June 15)
- Guest performance: Mayonnaise

Week 4 semifinals results
Contestant	Order	Act	Buzzes and judges' votes				Percentage	Result
Contestant	Order	Act	FMG	Kathryn	Eugene	Donny	Percentage	Result
Chikletz Family	1	Hip-hop dance group	–	–	–	–	10.62%	Eliminated
Jasmine Flores	2	Acrobatic dancer	–	–	–	–	7.97%	Eliminated
Mamhood Sounds	3	Vehicle sound impersonator	–	–	–	–	5.08%	Eliminated
Carl Quion	4	Magician	–	–	–	–	26.99%	Advanced
Fire Motion Lightrix	5	Light dance group		–		–	23.44%	Eliminated
Manza	6	Drag aerial balancer	–		–		25.88%	Advanced

== Finale ==
The grand finals, titled as The Final Showdown, was held on June 21 and 22, 2025, at The Theatre at Solaire Resort Entertainment City in Parañaque. Eight grand finalists competed to determine who will be crowned the season's grand champion. The grand winner received a cash prize of ₱2,000,000.

The finale is broken down into two parts: the performance night and the results night. The first four performers performed on Saturday, while the last four performed on Sunday, and the results were announced the same night. As with the previous two seasons, the scores will be based on judges' scores and public voting, with each component accounting for 50% of the total. The winner will be the contestant with the highest combined percentage score.

Jeffrey Bangcaya performed in advance outside the theater due to space constraints and safety concerns; his performance was recorded in one take.

Gerald Anderson made a brief appearance, promoting his upcoming show Sins of the Father.

At the end of the week, Ricardo Cadavero (a.k.a. Cardong Trumpo) was named the season's grand champion, with hip-hop dance group Femme MNL as the runner-up, and Carl Quion in third place. The latter two received a cash prize of ₱150,000 and ₱100,000, respectively.

Episode information:

- Episode hashtags: #PGT7TheFinalShowdown (June 21), #PGT7GrandWinner (June 22)
- Guest performance: Gary Valenciano

Legend:

- Winner
- Runner-up
- Third place
- Golden Buzzer Act
- Buzzed out

Grand finals results
Contestant	Order	Act	Performance description	Buzzes				Percentage	Result
Contestant	Order	Act	Performance description	FMG	Kathryn	Eugene	Donny	Percentage	Result
NDDU Gnrls	1	Hip-hop dance group	Performed a high-concept routine to Rico Blanco's "Yugto" in khaki combat-style jumpsuits, complete with creative visuals and sand for texture and visual impact.	–	–	–	–	37.1%	7th
Ody Sto. Domingo	2	Magician	Paid tribute to his late father, who enjoyed watching his magic tricks. He made illusions with his hands, sharing his father's love of stargazing and his ambition to become a magician. He also gave gifts to judges Eugene, Kathryn, FMG, Robi, and Melai, such as a light-up wristband and an Aquarius constellation, emphasizing the value of cherishing memories.	–	–	–	–	32.2%	8th
Manza	3	Drag aerial balancer	Swooped high above the stage and dropped backward into an upside-down pose in a captivating routine that included an aerial strap, an LGBT flag, and dramatic yellow wings.	–	–	–	–	44.6%	4th
Jessie J	4	Contemporary dancer	Performed to "Mangarap Ka" with impressive stunts, including 35 back handsprings in 30 seconds, filling the stage twice, and expressing gratitude to PGT for making the impossible happen.	–	–	–	–	40.5%	6th
Femme MNL	5	Hip-hop dance group	Dancing to "MAPA" by SB19, the group's performance reflects the struggles and strength of gays, highlighting workplace discrimination, parental support, and the importance of their parents' love in their fight for acceptance.	–	–	–	–	50.4%	2nd
Cardong Trumpo (Ricardo Cadavero)	6	Trompo spinner	Demonstrated skills in balancing a trumpo, spinning a top, guiding it across a wire line, and holding two inverted tops in a metal hoop. He also balanced a giant top on his hand, which drew a standing ovation from judges and loud cheers from the entire theater.	–	–	–	–	99.5%	1st
Carl Quion	7	Magician	Created a one-of-a-kind show by combining old wish lists, song hit books, alphabet flashcards, and celebrity icons, paying tribute to the Comedy King Dolphy. He recreates the Cosme family's living room from "Home Along Da Riles" with a vintage TV set, a miniature house, and a rotating illusion cabinet. The show concludes with Carl revealing the crumpled paper he had kept, revealing that it was himself all along.	–	–	–	–	47.8%	3rd
Jeffrey Bangcaya	8	Fire balancer	Performed outdoors, using flaming wheels, fire poi, and a giant metal cube to create a mesmerizing display of nerves and fireworks.	–	–	–	–	44.4%	5th
