= Pilipinas Got Talent season 6 =

Pilipinas Got Talent
- Season 6
- Hosted by: Billy Crawford; Toni Gonzaga
- Judges: Freddie M. Garcia; Angel Locsin; Robin Padilla; Vice Ganda
- Winner: Kristel de Catalina
- Runners-up: Julius Obrero & Rhea Marquez
- Finals venue: Bren Z. Guiao Sports Complex and Convention Center, San Fernando, Pampanga
- No. of episodes: 33

Release
- Original network: ABS-CBN
- Original release: January 6 – April 29, 2018

Season chronology
- ← Previous; Season 5 Next → Season 7

The sixth season of Pilipinas Got Talent premiered on ABS-CBN from January 6 to April 29, 2018, replacing Little Big Shots and was replaced by the second season of Your Face Sounds Familiar Kids.

Billy Crawford and Toni Gonzaga hosted the season, with Toni replacing Luis Manzano, who was unavailable due to other commitments. Freddie M. Garcia, Robin Padilla, Angel Locsin, and Vice Ganda returned as judges. Kristel de Catalina, a 32-year-old spiral pole dancer from Antipolo, Rizal, was crowned the season's winner. Wheelchair dancers Julius Obrero and Rhea Marquez from Pasig finished as the runner-up, while 28-year-old comedian Joven Olvido from Laguna secured third place. This season marked the second consecutive victory for a non-singing act on the show.

In March 2020, the season temporarily returned to air on Sundays, filling the second half timeslot of The Voice Teens, due to the enhanced community quarantine in Luzon done in response to the COVID-19 pandemic in the Philippines. However, the re-runs were abruptly cut after ABS-CBN was forced to indefinitely stop operations.

== Development ==
During the June 3, 2017, episode of It's Showtime, Billy Crawford announced that there will be auditions for the sixth season of the show. A teaser was shown during the commercial break of It's Showtime and the finals of I Can Do That. The initial audition dates and locations were shown during the commercial break of the Battles of The Voice Teens on June 11, 2017.

=== Host and judges ===
Judges and host of Pilipinas Got Talent season 6

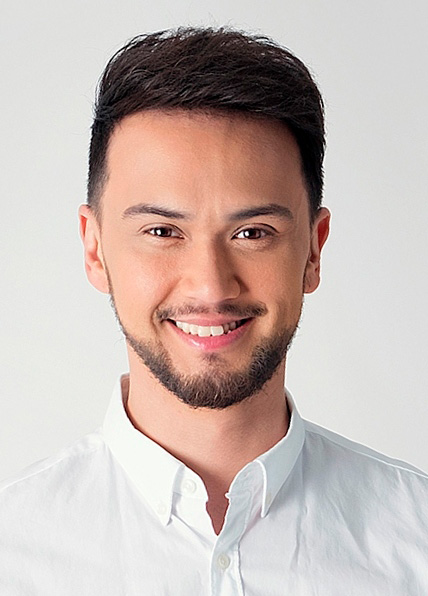
Billy Crawford (host)

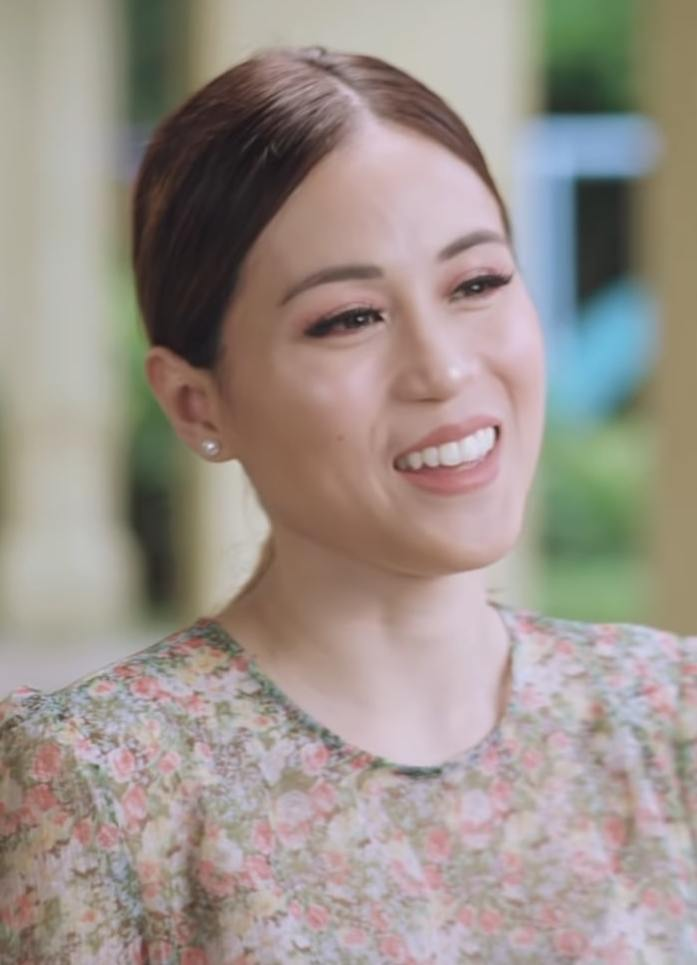
Toni Gonzaga (host)

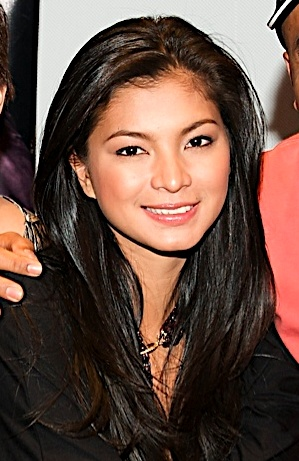
Angel Locsin

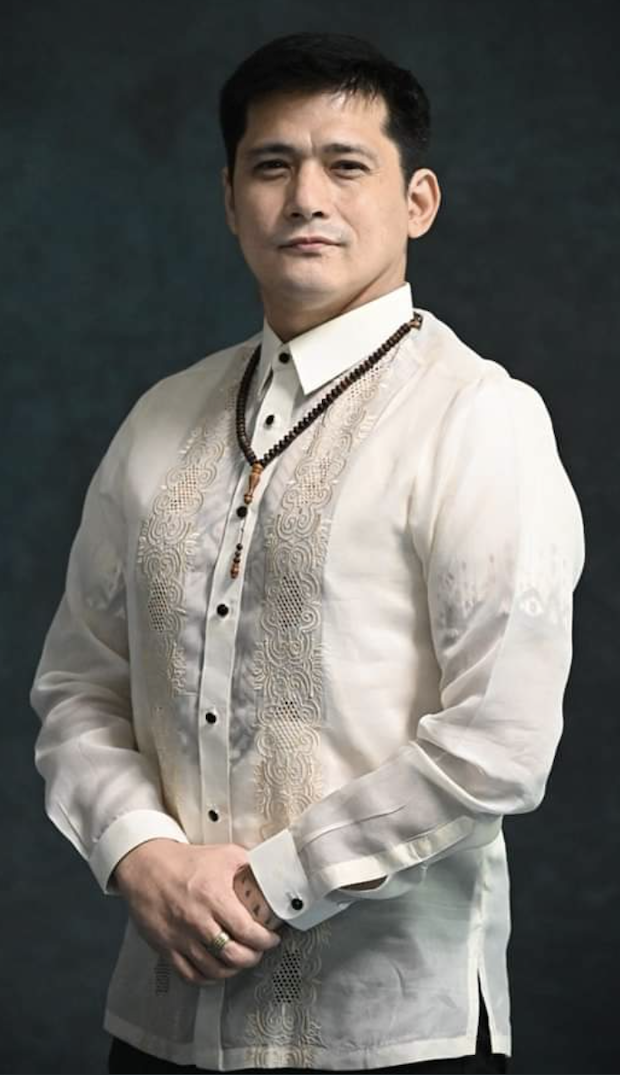
Robin Padilla

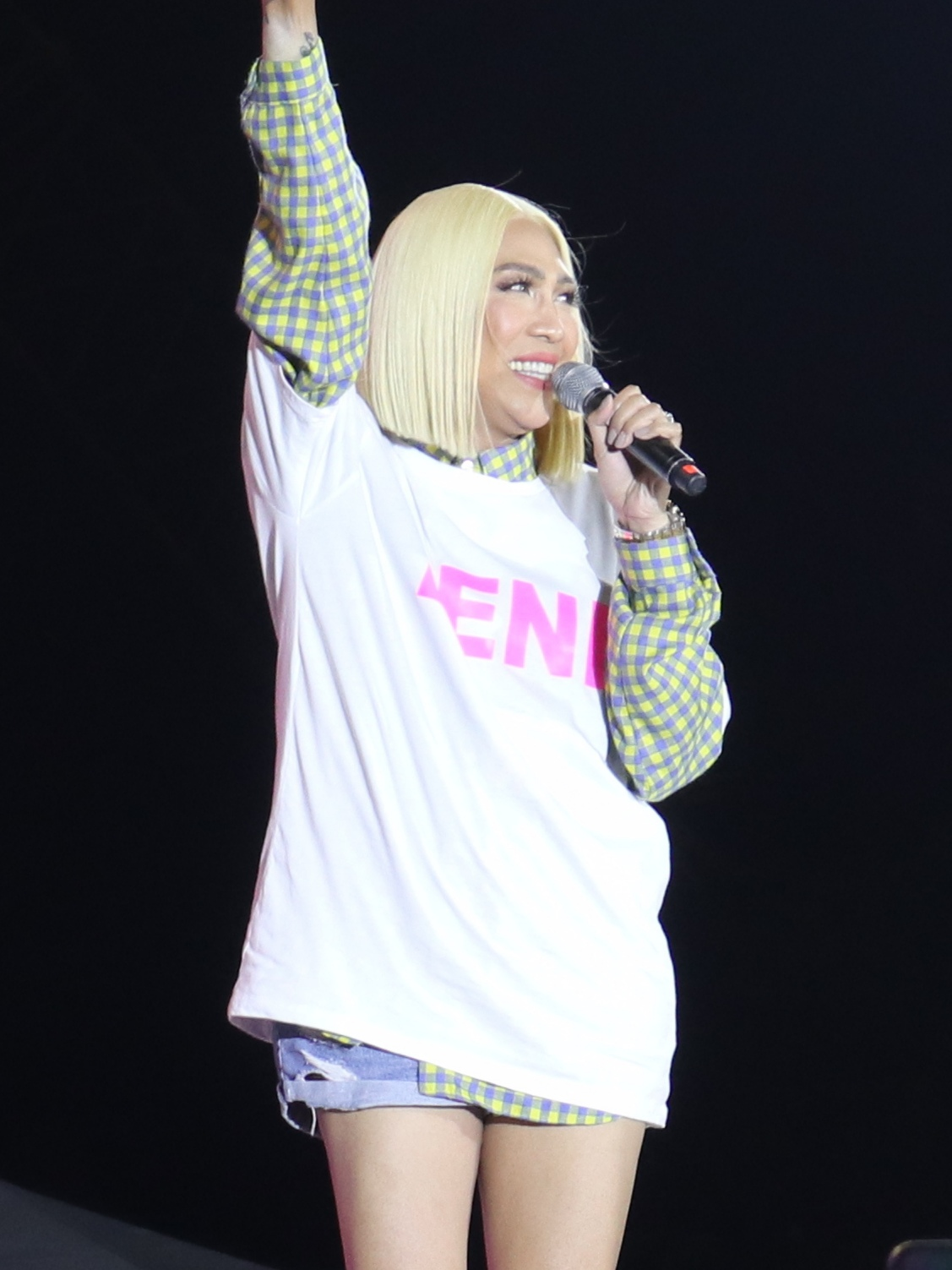
Vice Ganda

In October 2017, ABS-CBN released several teasers that showed every judge from the previous season. Billy Crawford returned for his hosting duty while Luis Manzano no longer returned as host since he is also hosting the game show I Can See Your Voice. Manzano was replaced by Toni Gonzaga. Jervi Li, commonly known as KaladKaren Davila, hosts the online show Pilipinas Got Talent Exclusives which is broadcast on the official YouTube and Facebook accounts of the show.

=== 2020 re-run ===
As a result of the 2020 Luzon enhanced community quarantine, the sixth season of Pilipinas Got Talent returned on air on March 29, 2020, temporarily replacing the second season of The Voice Teens on Sundays until the network was forced off the air.

== Auditions ==
=== Pre-auditions ===
The pre-auditions for the sixth season took place in key cities in the Philippines. Pre-auditions were held in Manila, Baguio, Lucena, Batangas, and Cebu. The pre-auditions were judged by Pilipinas Got Talent staff; those who passed will proceed to the live auditions.

Date of Pre-Audition	Pre-Audition Venue	City	Ref.
July 1–2, 2017	Baguio City National High School	Baguio, Benguet	
July 8–9, 2017	Benedicto College	Mandaue City, Cebu	
July 15–16, 2017	ABS-CBN Broadcasting Center	Quezon City, Metro Manila	
July 10, 2017 – 2017	Online Auditions		
August 13, 2017	University of Batangas	Batangas City	
August 19, 2017	ABS-CBN Center Road	Metro Manila	
October 28, 2017	ABS-CBN Center Road	Metro Manila	
August 20, 2017	Pacific Mall Lucena	Lucena City	
October 28, 2017	Shopwise	Cebu City	
October 28, 2017	Robinsons Place	Iloilo City	
October 29, 2017	Robinsons Place	Tacloban City	
October 29, 2017	Robinsons Place	Bacolod	
December 15, 2017	Alfonso Covered Court	Alfonso, Cavite	
December 28, 2017	Mena G. Valencia Gymnasium	Naujan, Oriental Mindoro	

=== Live auditions ===
The first live auditions in front of the four judges were taped on November 20–22, 2017 at the SM Seaside City Cebu in Cebu City. The Manila leg of live auditions will be taped on January 10–12 at Tanghalang Pasigueño in Pasig, Metro Manila.

Date of Live Audition	Live Audition Venue	City	Ref.
November 20–21, 2017	SM Seaside City	Cebu City	
November 22, 2017	SM Seaside Block 5 Open Area	Cebu City	
January 10–12, 2018	Tanghalang Pasigueño	Pasig, Metro Manila	

Like the previous season, voting works on a majority-of-three basis. If an act receives three or more "yes" votes from the judges, they advance to the judges' cull.

The live auditions once again feature the Golden Buzzer. Each judge would have one chance to use the Golden Buzzer throughout the auditions. New for this season, apart from the judges, the hosts (as one) get an opportunity to press the Golden Buzzer, bringing the total number of Golden Acts to five. The so-called Golden Acts, those on whom the Golden Buzzer is used, would automatically advance to the semifinals. Garcia was the first to press his golden buzzer for the pull up bars exhibition group, Bardilleranz. Locsin was next to press the golden buzzer for the wheelchair dance duo, Julius Obrero & Rhea Marquez. Padilla used his golden buzzer for hip-hop dance group, Nocturnal Dance Company. Viceral was the last judge to use the golden buzzer and gave it to spiral pole dancer, Kristel de Catalina. Crawford and Gonzaga was the last to use the golden buzzer and gave it to the acrobatic duo, DWC Aeon Flex. Garcia, Locsin, and Padilla used their golden buzzers in the Cebu auditions while Viceral and the hosts, Crawford and Gonzaga, used their golden buzzers in the Manila auditions.

Below are the acts who are confirmed within the show to have received at least three Yes votes and thus had successfully passed their auditions, as well as the Golden Acts. The list does not cover everyone who had passed. Due to time constraints, some acts, named or otherwise, are seen with their fates partially known (only one or two known Yes vote) or edited out completely from broadcast and are thus not listed.

Successful auditionees of Pilipinas Got Talent (season 6)
Auditionees from Luzon: Mama's Boyz, Sta. Mesa, Manila – Towel Dance; Bardilleranz, Baguio – Pull-up Bars Exhibition; Jiwan Kim, 20, Muntinlupa – Magic Trick; Johnny Villanueva, 26, Quezon City – Pole Dancing; Jonacris Bandillo, 33, Laguna – Billiard Tricks; Sinag Dance Community, 13–35, San Jose Del Monte, Bulacan – Dance; Kimberly Collado, 26, Cagayan – Harp and sing; Karl Luigi Villareal (Karl Matrix), 30, Cavite – Illusion TV magic; John Mark Bayot, 21, Cavite – Vape smoke tricks; Orville Tonido, 32, Quezon City – Lipsync with dahon act; Julius Obrero & Rhea Marquez, 33 & 24, Pasig & Cebu – Wheelchair dance	Auditionees from Visayas: Shadow Arts Theater Organization (SATO), Palo, Leyte – Shadow Play; Angelisa del Rosario, 67, Cebu City – Zumba; Type 1 Dance Company, Cebu City – Dance; Janah Jade Lavador, 13, Cebu City – Arnis Exhibition; CEBECO II Blue Knights, Cebu City – Pole Balancing; Maka Girls, 20–22, Mandaue City – Sing; Mary Grace Decafe, 29, Iloilo – Comedy Act; Tribu Burulakaw, Iloilo City – Fire Dance; Michael Aco, 27, Cebu – Sing and Act; Yan-Yan and Dad Dance Duo, 10 & 38, Bacolod City – Dance
Auditionees from Mindanao
Auditionees from the overseas
NOTE: Please be guided that this list contains the aired auditions only.

== Judges Cull ==
The Judges Cull was held at ABS-CBN Studios, Quezon City, Metro Manila. It was shown at the end of the final auditions episode on March 18, 2018. Throughout the auditions, 98 acts have received at least 3 yeses from the judges. Apart from the 5 golden buzzer acts, the judges picked 23 acts who would compete in the live semifinals, bringing the total to 28.

This is the first season to feature 28 semifinalists only, as opposed to previous seasons with 36 semifinalists (quarterfinalists in season 4). The number of semifinalists, which is not divisible by six, takes into account the five Golder Buzzer acts and the abbreviated second semifinal on April 1; the Saturday before (March 31) would be Black Saturday.

=== Top 28 Result Summary ===
- Winner
- Runner-up
- Finalist
- Semi-finalist (lost judges' vote)
- Golden Buzzer Act

Name of act	Age(s)	Genre	Act	Hometown	Semifinal Week	Result
Kristel de Catalina	32	Variety	Spiral Pole Dance	Antipolo, Rizal	2	Winner
Julius Obrero & Rhea Marquez	33 & 24	Variety	Wheelchair Dance	Pasig	4	Runner-up
Joven Olvido	28	Variety	Comedy	Laguna	4	Third place
DWC Aeon Flex	10 & 10	Variety	Acrobatic Exhibition	Davao del Norte	3	Fourth place
Bardilleranz	18–38	Variety	Pull-up Bars Exhibition	Baguio	3	Fifth place
Nocturnal Dance Company	18–28	Dancing	Hip-hop Dance	Quezon City	1	Sixth place
Jonacris Bandillo	33	Variety	Billiard tricks	Laguna	5	Seventh place
CEBECO II Blue Knights	—	Variety	Utility Pole Balancing	Cebu	5	Eighth place
Xtreme Dancers	20–26	Dancing	Hip-hop Dance	Korondal, South Cotabato	2	Ninth place
Orville Tonido	33	Variety	Lip-sync Act	Quezon City	1	Tenth place
Antonio Bathan Jr.	18	Variety	Spoken Word Poetry	Batangas	5	Eliminated
Angel Fire New Gen	12–26	Dancing	Belly Dancing	Cebu	5	Eliminated
Dancing Fire Warriors	17–34	Variety	Fire Dance	Cebu	5	Eliminated
Rico the Magician	67	Variety	Magician	Caloocan	5	Eliminated
Miggy Hizon	19	Variety	Yo-yo Tricks	Quezon City	4	Eliminated
Aloha Philippines	11–42	Dancing	Poi Dance	Baguio	4	Eliminated
Dauntless Republic	17–23	Dancing	Hip-hop Dance	Cavite	4	Eliminated
Karl Matrix	30	Variety	Illusion	Cavite	4	Eliminated
Prinsipe Makata	35	Variety	Poetry	Bulacan	3	Eliminated
Junior FMD Extreme	9–18	Dancing	Hip-hop Dance	Marikina	3	Eliminated
Mad Queens	20–27	Dancing	Dance Act	Manila	3	Eliminated
Pedro Lachica	51	Dancing	Pop and Lock	Quezon City	3	Eliminated
Bu-aywa Folkloric Dance Troupe	13–19	Dancing	Folk Dance	Calapan, Oriental Mindoro	2	Eliminated
Jeptah Callitong	17	Variety	Magic	Ilocos Sur	2	Eliminated
JM Bayot	21	Variety	Vape Smoke Tricks	Cavite	1	Eliminated
Johnny Villanueva	26	Variety	Pole Dancing	Quezon City	1	Eliminated
Maka Girls	20–22	Singing	Singing trio	Cebu	1	Eliminated
Salimpokaw Ko Masa Dance Troupe	14–38	Dancing	Singkil	Marawi	1	Eliminated

== Semifinals ==
The Semifinals began on March 24, 2018, in Newport Performing Arts Theater, Resorts World Manila in Pasay, Metro Manila. Each week (except week 2), performances from four out of six acts took place on Saturday nights, while during Sunday nights, the two remaining acts performed and the results are announced on the same night.

Garcia missed the five semifinal rounds due to the death of his spouse. Due to his absence, his buzzer was removed from the stage, while Robin and Angel switched places.

Starting this round, the show airs at 7:30 pm during Saturdays.

Voting for the acts starts after all the acts for the week have performed. There are two ways to vote.

- SMS voting. Texting the name of the act to 2366.
- Online voting via Google. By typing the keyword PGT Vote in the search box, clickable photos of the contestants that had performed for that week will show up in the search results page; one Google account is entitled to one vote only.

=== Semifinals summary ===
- Won the public vote
- Won the judges' vote
- Lost the judges' vote
- Golden Buzzer Act
- Buzzed out
- Judge's vote

==== Week 1 (March 24 & 25) ====
- Guest performer: PGT season 5 winner Power Duo

Contestant	Order	Act	Buzzes and judges' votes			Percentage	Result
Contestant	Order	Act	Robin	Angel	Vice	Percentage	Result
Maka Girls	1	Singing trio				6.56%	Eliminated
Johnny Villanueva	2	Pole dance				2.53%	Eliminated
Salimpokaw Ko Masa Dance Troupe	3	Cultural dance				5.85%	Eliminated
Orville Tonido	4	Lip-sync				19.80%	Advanced
Nocturnal Dance Company	5	Hip-hop dance				44.55%	Advanced
JM Bayot	6	Vape smoke tricks				20.70%	Eliminated

==== Week 2 (April 1) ====
Only 4 acts performed this week due to the Holy Week special programming until Black Saturday.

For this week, the three acts who did not win the public votes proceed to the judges' votes. In case the three acts received one vote each, the results return to the public vote.

- Guest performers: Eumee Lyn Capile, Elha Nympha, AC Bonifacio, Sam Shoaf, Nyoy Volante, and PGT season 5 finalist Mastermind

Contestant	Order	Act	Buzzes and judges' votes			Percentage	Result
Contestant	Order	Act	Robin	Angel	Vice	Percentage	Result
Xtreme Dancers	1	Hip-hop dance				6.52%	Advanced
Jeptah Callitong	2	Magic				11.55%	Eliminated
Bu-aywa Folkloric Dance Troupe	3	Folk dance				2.97%	Eliminated
Kristel de Catalina	4	Spiral pole dance				78.96%	Advanced

==== Week 3 (April 7 & 8) ====
Joven Olvido, Rico the Magician, and Antonio Bathan Jr. were previously announced to perform in this round, but due to circumstances so far unknown to viewers, their performances were rescheduled to the later rounds. Junior FMD Extreme, DWC Aeon Flex, Prinsipe Makata took their places.

- Guest performers: Jed Madela, BoybandPH, and TNT Boys

Contestant	Order	Act	Buzzes and judges' votes			Percentage	Result
Contestant	Order	Act	Robin	Angel	Vice	Percentage	Result
Junior FMD Extreme	1	Hip-hop dance				3.89%	Eliminated
DWC Aeon Flex	2	Acrobatic exhibition				12.59%	Advanced
Prinsipe Makata	3	Poetry				29.81%	Eliminated
Mad Queens	4	Dance				1.68%	Eliminated
Pedro Lachica	5	Pop and lock				12.07%	Eliminated
Bardilleranz	6	Pull-up bars exhibition				39.97%	Advanced

==== Week 4 (April 14 & 15) ====
Billy Crawford was absent in the Saturday show, and the show was solely hosted by Gonzaga due to Crawford being a guest in Sarah Geronimo's This 15 Me concert.

- Guest performers: Angeline Quinto, Erik Santos, Jason Dy, Noven Belleza, and PGT season 1 winner Jovit Baldivino

Contestant	Order	Act	Buzzes and judges' votes			Percentage	Result
Contestant	Order	Act	Robin	Angel	Vice	Percentage	Result
Aloha Philippines	1	Poi dance				2.81%	Eliminated
Dauntless Republic	2	Hip-hop dance				0.69%	Eliminated
Karl Matrix	3	Illusion				0.57%	Eliminated
Joven Olvido	4	Comedy				55.71%	Advanced
Miggy Hizon	5	Yo-yo tricks				7.45%	Eliminated
Julius Obrero & Rhea Marquez	6	Wheelchair dance				32.77%	Advanced

==== Week 5 (April 21 & 22) ====
This particular semifinal week was held outdoors at the MX Messiah Fairgrounds in Taytay, Rizal due to the size of stage required for the pool tables Jonacris Bandillo used and the dangerous nature of the fire acts of the Dancing Fire Warriors and Angel Fire New Gen. Due to safety concerns, CEBECO II Blue Knights held their semifinals performance in advance under broad daylight at an open field in Bogo, Cebu; several members were present in Taytay to personally hear the judges' comments.

Again, Gonzaga hosted the show without Crawford due to latter's wedding held a day before the semifinals.

- Guest performers: PGT season 5 runner-up The Amazing Pyra and YFSF: Kids season 1 winner Awra Briguela, with XB Gensan

Contestant	Order	Act	Buzzes and judges' votes			Percentage	Result
Contestant	Order	Act	Robin	Angel	Vice	Percentage	Result
Dancing Fire Warriors	1	Fire dance				2.85%	Eliminated
Rico the Magician	2	Magic				6.02%	Eliminated
Antonio Bathan Jr.	3	Spoken word poetry				12.88%	Eliminated
Angel Fire New Gen	4	Belly dancing				8.58%	Eliminated
Jonacris Bandillo	5	Billiard tricks				35.37%	Advanced
CEBECO II Blue Knights	6	Utility pole balancing				34.29%	Advanced

== Grand Finals ==
Dubbed as "The Greatest Showdown", the grand finals took place at the Bren Z. Guiao Sports Complex and Convention Center over a span of two nights, the performance night (April 28) and the results night (April 29).

Just like in the semifinals, CEBECO II Blue Knights held their finals performance in advance under broad daylight at an open field in Bogo, Cebu due to safety concerns. The whole performance was taped in one take.

Still, Garcia missed the grand finals due to the death of his spouse.

Each grand final episode aired for 1 hour and 45 minutes from 7:15 PM to 9:00 PM.

The winner receives a vacation package from 2GO Travel and a cash prize of two million pesos. Just like the previous season, the winner will be based from the public votes (50%) and the scores of the judges (50%).

- Guest performers: Gary Valenciano and Ogie Alcasid

Color key

- Winner
- Runner-up
- Third place
- Golden Buzzer Act

Contestant	Order	Act	Buzzes			Percentage	Result
Contestant	Order	Act	Robin	Angel	Vice	Percentage	Result
Nocturnal Dance Company	1	Hip-hop dance				43.91%	6th
Kristel de Catalina	2	Spiral pole dance				99.67%	1st
CEBECO II Blue Knights	3	Utility pole balancing				39.68%	8th
Jonacris Bandillo	4	Billiard tricks				40.59%	7th
Xtreme Dancers	5	Hip-hop dance				31.70%	9th
Joven Olvido	6	Comedy				79.05%	3rd
Bardilleranz	7	Pull-up bars exhibition				60.65%	5th
Orville Tonido	8	Lip-sync act				27.21%	10th
Julius Obrero & Rhea Marquez	9	Wheelchair dance				84.60%	2nd
DWC Aeon Flex	10	Acrobatic exhibition				68.79%	4th

== Controversies and criticisms ==
=== South Korean forced to speak Tagalog ===
Robin Padilla drew flak from viewers after forcing a South Korean contestant to speak in Tagalog. In the episode aired on January 13, 2018, Kim Jiwan, a South Korean who has been living in the Philippines for ten years, asked Padilla to help him with his card trick. Padilla declined, demanding that Kim should speak in Tagalog: "Iho, Pilipinas Got Talent. Mag-Tagalog ka kasi magmumukha kaming katawa-tawa kung mag-i-English kami dito para sa'yo. Pilipinas Got Talent. Mag-Tagalog ka, iho." (Son, this is Pilipinas Got Talent. Speak in Tagalog because we will become a laughingstock if we speak in English just for you. This is Pilipinas Got Talent. Speak in Tagalog.) Co-judge Angel Locsin tried to alleviate the situation by teaching Kim some Tagalog phrases necessary for his performance. Locsin also allowed Kim to perform the trick on her instead. Padilla eventually participated in the trick and shook Kim's hand after the performance. Kim then apologized to the judges and promised to learn to speak Tagalog. Co-judge Vice Ganda also commented that Kim is obliged to learn Tagalog as a resident of the Philippines.

Viewers quickly turned to social media, stating that Padilla's attitude towards the Korean contestant was rude and racist. After being criticized by the netizens, Padilla did not express any remorse for his actions. He continued to comment on his Instagram account, with a middle finger emoji, saying: "Ako pa ba ang dapat magadjust sa isang dayuhan na 10 taon na sa Pilipinas? Naku hindi po mangyayari! Never!" (Am I supposed to adjust to a foreigner who has been living for 10 years in the Philippines? That won't happen! Never!)

=== Playgirls ===
In the March 3, 2018, episode, the Playgirls, a four-member girl group, washed a car while gyrating and twerking in their underwear. Angel Locsin pressed her buzzer a few seconds into the performance, later explaining that she did not want men to objectify the Playgirls. "Kaya ko kayo binuzz, ayaw kong ma-objectify kayo. Masyado ako nagmamalasakit para sa inyo para i-go ko 'to at patuloy kayong panoorin ng mga kalalakihan na ginagawa iyan." ("I buzzed you because I don't want you to be objectified. I care too much for you to allow you to be watched by men while you're doing that.") Robin Padilla then asked the Playgirls to clarify if the sultry performance was indeed their choice and if they enjoyed what they did, to which they replied "yes". Padilla then added, "Gusto niyo ba 'yun na mga kalalakihan ay humahanga sa inyo?" ("Do you like it that men admire you?"), to which Locsin protested, "Seryoso ka?" ("Are you serious?") Padilla then explained that he wanted to hear the performers' viewpoint, wherein they stood by their earlier performance. Padilla then acknowledged Locsin's statements, telling the Playgirls that Locsin—a women's rights advocate—intended to protect them. Padilla then apologized to Locsin.

The Playgirls' performance and the exchange between Padilla and Locsin sparked online discussions about the sexualization and objectification of women. Some netizens agreed with Locsin's position, while others interpreted her opinion as slut-shaming. The Playgirls themselves criticized Locsin on their own Facebook pages after the incident, pointing out her bikini costume when she played Darna back in 2005. Meanwhile, the Gabriela Women's Party commended Locsin "for her firm stance against the objectification of women".

=== Robin Padilla's sexist remarks towards Kristel de Catalina ===
In the course of the season, Robin Padilla came under fire numerous times for his remarks about the eventual winner Kristel de Catalina that were sexist and misogynistic.

==== Semifinals ====
During the semifinals, Robin Padilla was severely criticized by the viewers for his unsolicited comment to Kristel de Catalina. During the second week of live semifinals aired on April 1, 2018, Kristel de Catalina, a single mom, performed a spiral pole dance act that received a standing ovation from the judges and the audience. Angel Locsin was the first to comment, stating, "Ikaw ang pinakamabigat na makakalaban ng contestants ng PGT. Kailangan talaga nila mag-level up para makatapat sayo. Sobrang wow." ("You are the toughest contestant to beat in PGT. They really need to level up. You are overwhelming.") Locsin was followed by Robin Padilla. "Umpisa pa lang solb na ko sayo eh. Alam mo, 'di ako natakot sa lahat ng ginawa mo. Wala akong naramdamang takot kasi alam kong kayang kaya mo. Perfect yung [form] mo; precision." ("I've liked [your performance] from the start. I wasn't scared at all by everything you did, because I know you can really do it. Your form is perfect; you’ve got precision.") The last to comment was Vice Ganda. "Tapos na?" (It's over already?), he asked jokingly. "Tapos na, 'di ba? Thank you so much because you saved the night. Wala. Lampaso yung kalaban. Nilampaso mo yung kalaban." ("It's over, right? Thank you so much because you saved the night. You've swept away the competition and your competitors.") Vice Ganda also added, "Lalong nagpaganda pa 'yung simbolismo nung ginagawa mo, 'yung simbolismo na ginagawa mo na pinapakita mo sa buong mundo na ikaw ay isang solo parent. Ikaw ay isang babae at ang isang babae ay kayang umangat at magningning kahit nag-iisa." ("The symbolism of what you did all the more made things beautiful, how you are showing the whole world that you are a single parent. You are a woman, and a woman can rise above and shine although alone.") It was at this point when Robin Padilla suddenly spoke to the microphone, exclaiming, "Pero kailangan mo pa rin ng lalaki!" ("But you still need a man!") Vice Ganda immediately clarified, pointing to Padilla, "Para sa kanya 'yon. Para kay Robin 'yon." ("That's for him. That's for Robin.")

The viewers turned again to social media quickly, calling out Padilla for his sexist and misogynistic remark.

==== Grand Finals ====
Padilla was once again under fire by netizens for his sexist and misogynistic comment made after Kristel de Catalina's grand final performance on April 28, 2018. Padilla commented first, saying, "Kristel, alam mo, 'yung mga ginagawa mo delikado, pero gusto kong malaman mo na kahit isang beses hindi ako ninerbiyos dahil alam ko napakagaling mo, napakahusay mo." ("Kristel, you know, what you’re doing is dangerous, but I want you to know that no matter how many times I watch you perform, I don’t get nervous, because I know that you are so great, you are so talented.") "Gusto ko lang malaman mo na gustong gusto ko na meron sa'yong nag-a-assist sa'yo na lalaki ngayon. Isang malaking bagay na makita ko ang assistant mo may lalaki diyan sa baba, hindi man katabi mo pero assistant mo," Padilla added. ("I just want you to know that I really like it that there's a guy assisting you now. It’s a huge thing for me to see that you have a male assistant there below; he may not be next to you, but he's still your assistant.")

The viewers slammed the judge through social media sites. One Twitter user called him out for tagging women as "individuals who cannot live without men".

== Television ratings ==
Television ratings for the sixth season of Pilipinas Got Talent on ABS-CBN are gathered from Kantar Media. Kantar Media uses a nationwide panel size of 2,610 urban and rural homes that represent 100% of total Philippine TV viewing population. It is a multinational market research group that specializes in audience measurement in more than 80 countries.

Color keys
Highest rating during the season
Lowest rating during the season

Episode		Original air date	Timeslot (PST)	Rating	Rank		Source
Episode		Original air date	Timeslot (PST)	Rating	Timeslot	Primetime	Source
1	"Live auditions premiere"	January 6, 2018	Saturday, 7:00 p.m.	36.8%	1	1	
2	"Live auditions – part 2"	January 7, 2018	Sunday, 7:30 p.m.	40.8%	1	1	
3	"Live auditions – part 3"	January 13, 2018	Saturday, 7:00 p.m.	36.4%	1	1	
4	"Live auditions – part 4"	January 14, 2018	Sunday, 7:30 p.m.	39.2%	1	1	
5	"Live auditions – part 5"	January 20, 2018	Saturday, 7:00 p.m.	35.7%	1	1	
6	"Live auditions – part 6"	January 21, 2018	Sunday, 7:30 p.m.	39.9%	1	1	
7	"Live auditions – part 7"	January 27, 2018	Saturday, 7:00 p.m.	36.3%	1	1	
8	"Live auditions – part 8"	January 28, 2018	Sunday, 7:30 p.m.	39.3%	1	1	
9	"Live auditions – part 9"	February 3, 2018	Saturday, 7:00 p.m.	37.5%	1	1	
10	"Live auditions – part 10"	February 4, 2018	Sunday, 7:30 p.m.	43.3%	1	1	
11	"Live auditions – part 11"	February 10, 2018	Saturday, 7:00 p.m.	35.9%	1	1	
12	"Live auditions – part 12"	February 11, 2018	Sunday, 7:30 p.m.	41.6%	1	1	
13	"Live auditions – part 13"	February 17, 2018	Saturday, 7:00 p.m.	37.3%	1	1	
14	"Live auditions – part 14"	February 18, 2018	Sunday, 7:30 p.m.	40.8%	1	1	
15	"Live auditions – part 15"	February 24, 2018	Saturday, 7:00 p.m.	40.7%	1	1	
16	"Live auditions – part 16"	February 25, 2018	Sunday, 7:30 p.m.	40.0%	1	1	
17	"Live auditions – part 17"	March 3, 2018	Saturday, 7:00 p.m.	37.6%	1	1	
18	"Live auditions – part 18"	March 4, 2018	Sunday, 7:30 p.m.	42.9%	1	1	
19	"Live auditions – part 19"	March 10, 2018	Saturday, 7:00 p.m.	37.1%	1	1	
20	"Live auditions – part 20"	March 11, 2018	Sunday, 7:30 p.m.	39.0%	1	1	
21	"Live auditions – part 21"	March 17, 2018	Saturday, 7:00 p.m.	35.7%	1	1	
22	"Live auditions – part 22"	March 18, 2018	Sunday, 7:30 p.m.	35.4%	1	1	
23	"1st Live semifinals – part 1"	March 24, 2018	Saturday, 7:30 p.m.	39.4%	1	1	
24	"1st Live semifinals – part 2"	March 25, 2018	Sunday, 7:30 p.m.	37.9%	1	1	
25	"2nd Live semifinals"	April 1, 2018	Sunday, 7:30 p.m.	35.9%	1	1	
26	"3rd Live semifinals – part 1"	April 7, 2018	Saturday, 7:30 p.m.	36.2%	1	1	
27	"3rd Live semifinals – part 2"	April 8, 2018	Sunday, 7:30 p.m.	37.3%	1	1	
28	"4th Live semifinals – part 1"	April 14, 2018	Saturday, 7:30 p.m.	36.1%	1	1	
29	"4th Live semifinals – part 2"	April 15, 2018	Sunday, 7:30 p.m.	37.9%	1	1	
30	"5th Live semifinals – part 1"	April 21, 2018	Saturday, 7:30 p.m.	36.1%	1	1	
31	"5th Live semifinals – part 2"	April 22, 2018	Sunday, 7:30 p.m.	34.6%	1	1	
32	"The Greatest Showdown – part 1"	April 28, 2018	Saturday, 7:30 p.m.	37.5%	1	1	
33	"The Greatest Showdown – part 2"	April 29, 2018	Sunday, 7:30 p.m.	39.7%	1	1	
Season average				38.1%	1	1	
