= Pilipinas Got Talent season 5 =

Pilipinas Got Talent
- Season 5
- Hosted by: Luis Manzano; Billy Crawford
- Judges: Robin Padilla; Freddie M. Garcia; Vice Ganda; Angel Locsin
- Winner: Power Duo
- Runner-up: The Amazing Pyra
- Finals venue: Mall of Asia Arena; Pasay, Philippines
- No. of episodes: 36

Release
- Original network: ABS-CBN
- Original release: January 23 – May 22, 2016

Season chronology
- ← Previous; Season 4 Next → Season 6

The fifth season of Pilipinas Got Talent premiered on ABS-CBN from January 23 to May 22, 2016, replacing the second season of Your Face Sounds Familiar and was replaced by the third season of The Voice Kids.

Billy Crawford and Luis Manzano returned as hosts for the season. Of the three judges from the previous four seasons, only Freddie M. Garcia reprised his role. He was joined by actress Angel Locsin, actor Robin Padilla, and comedian Vice Ganda, who had debuted as a guest judge in the previous season, filling in for Ai-Ai delas Alas during the 5th quarterfinals week due to her illness.

Contemporary dance duo Power Duo from Angono, Rizal, emerged as the season's winner. Poi dancer Marianne Madrigal (a.k.a. Amazing Pyra) from Antipolo was named the runner-up, while magician Ody Sto. Domingo from Sta. Mesa, Manila secured third place. This season marked the first time in the show's history that a singing act did not win.

== Development ==
During the May 17, 2015, episode of ASAP 20, host Luis Manzano announced that the show will return for its fifth season, following the success of the four Filipino acts who competed in the grand finals of Asia's Got Talent. Two of those acts were formerly part of the show: singer Gerphil "Fame" Flores, who competed in the first season but lost the judges' vote in the fourth semifinal week, and shadow play group El Gamma Penumbra, who competed in the third season but placed fourth in the finals. Flores placed third while El Gamma won the inaugural season of the said regional franchise of Got Talent.

=== Host and judges ===
Judges and host of Pilipinas Got Talent season 5

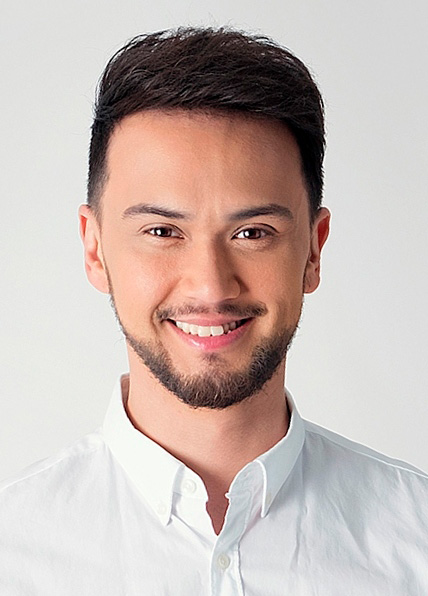
Billy Crawford (host)

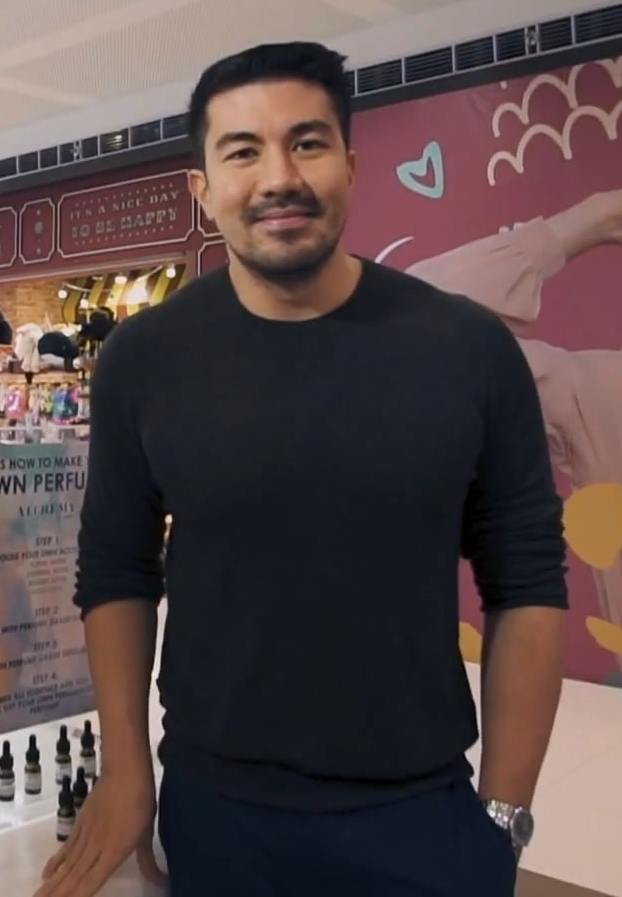
Luis Manzano (host)

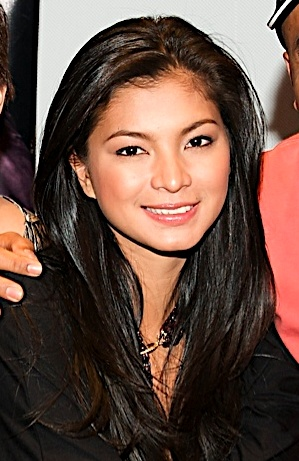
Angel Locsin

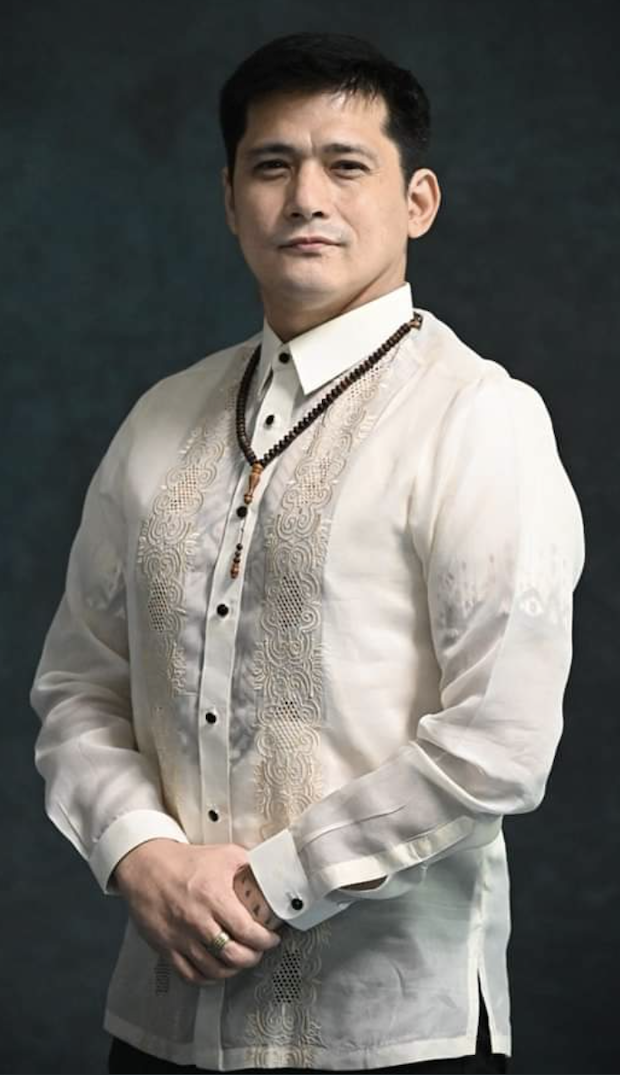
Robin Padilla

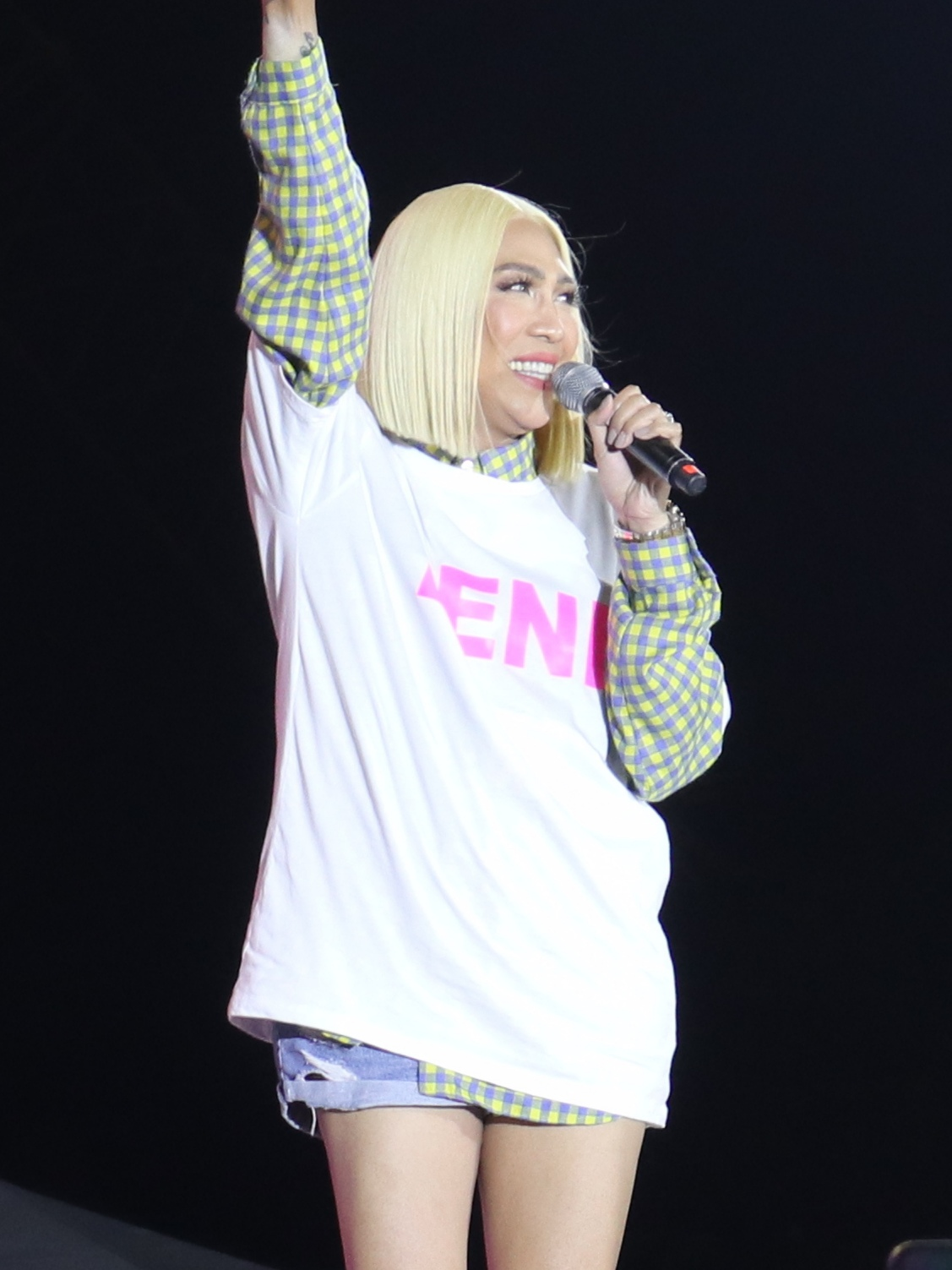
Vice Ganda

Billy Crawford and Luis Manzano are set to reprise their hosting duties although the judging panel will have significant changes. Ai-Ai delas Alas and Kris Aquino will not return to the judging panel; the former due to her return to GMA Network, while the latter cited health problems and give time to her sons. ABS-CBN board member Freddie M. Garcia confirmed his return as judge for the fifth consecutive season. On January 8, 2016, a teaser during FPJ's Ang Probinsyano revealed that actress Angel Locsin will be one of the judges. On January 9, 2016, a teaser during It's Showtime revealed that actor Robin Padilla will join Garcia and Locsin in the judging panel. The next day, January 10, a teaser during ASAP revealed that comedian Vice Ganda, who filled on delas Alas' slot last season as a guest judge, will be the fourth judge for this season.

=== Voting mechanics ===
Aside from the usual SMS voting, new to this season is the addition of an online voting method done via Google Philippines. By typing the keyword PGT5 in the search box, clickable photos of the contestants that had performed for that week will show up in the search results page; one Google account is entitled to one vote only.

=== Timeslot ===
When the show initially premiered on January 23, 2016, it initially aired at 9:30 PM, filling the timeslot previously vacated by the second season of Your Face Sounds Familiar after it ended on December 13, 2015. Prior to the season's premiere, the temporary filler movie block Kapamilya Weekend Specials took over the said timeslot. On February 13, 2016, after Dance Kids ended, it was moved to an earlier timeslot of 7:30 PM to give its timeslot to I Love OPM. On April 24, 2016, the show temporarily aired at a late timeslot of 10:00 PM to give way to the 2016 Philippine presidential election final debate.

== Auditions ==
=== Pre-auditions ===
The pre-auditions for the fifth season took place in key cities in the Philippines. Pre-auditions were held in Manila, Batangas, Cebu, and Davao. But this season, the pre-auditions are judged by Pilipinas Got Talent staff and those who passed will make it to the live audition.

There were also mini-auditions in several cities and provinces in the Philippines including Antique, Aurora, Cabanatuan, Cagayan de Oro, Catarman, Catbalogan, Guimaras, Imus, Kalibo, Legazpi, Roxas, Tacloban, and Tarlac City. These mini-auditions are judged by Pilipinas Got Talent staff and those who passed will make it to the live auditions.

In addition, online auditions was put up where contestants can upload their own audition video and send it to the website of Pilipinas Got Talent.

Date of Pre-Audition	Pre-Audition Venue	City
October 10–11, 2015	North Gate, Faith Catholic School	Tanauan City, Batangas
October 16–17, 2015	Almendras Gym of Davao Recreational Center	Davao City
October 24–25, 2015	Benedicto College	Mandaue City
November 6–7, 2015	ABS-CBN Broadcasting Center	Quezon City

=== Live auditions ===
The live auditions in front of the judges were held on January 12–14, 2016 at the Kia Theater in Araneta Center, Cubao, Quezon City (for the Manila auditions) and on January 21–23, 2016 at the Davao del Sur Coliseum in Digos (for the Visayas and Mindanao auditions). This fifth season, voting works on a majority-of-three basis (as there are now four judges). If an act receives three or more "yes" votes from the judges, they advance to the next round of the competition which is the judges cull.

Date of Live-Audition	Live-Audition Venue	City
January 12–14, 2016	Kia Theater	Araneta Center, Cubao, Quezon City
January 21–23, 2016	Davao del Sur Coliseum	Digos

Below are the acts that had received at least three Yes votes from the judges, and as well as those Golden acts:

Successful auditionees of Pilipinas Got Talent (season 5)
Auditionees from Luzon: Histacity – dance group, Marikina; The Poor Voice – male singing duo, Pasig; Mercy Viola Daily, 66 – rapper, Baguio; Geffrey delos Reyes, 29 – close-up magician, Pasig; Splitters – dance group, Manila; Rouge – all-female rock band, Quezon City; Vernon De Vera – escape artist/illusionist, Marikina; Power Duo – acrobats/dancers, Rizal; X-Breaker - Hip-Hop dance group, Bacoor; Rayner Dalde, 25 - Opera Singer, San Fabian, Pangasinan; Pamilya Kwela - Comedy dance group, Rodriguez; Back Ache Boys - Senior Boy band, Quezon City; Louie Lorenzo, 25 - Male Aerialist, Quezon City; Supper Goodie - Pep Squad duo, Calamba; Moterozzo Twins - Singing/Beatbox Duo, Las Piñas; Celine Manese, 19 - Pole Dancer, Parañaque; Micah Cate, 26 - Singer, Manila; Rolando Parico, 53 - Beatles Parody performer, Santa Mesa, Manila; Amazing Pyra, 21 - Fire Dancer, Antipolo, Rizal; Dino Splendid Acrobats, 20-37 - All-Male Acrobat Group, Santo Tomas (Batangas); Jeremiah Velasco, 33 - Singer, Kawit; Mark Mestiola, 21 - Basketball performer, Muñoz; Allyza Imatong, 8 - Pole Dancer, Rodriguez; Shadow Ace, 19 - Shadow Play Performer, Calatagan, Batangas; Liquid Concepts - Flair Bartending Couple, Quezon City; The Chosen Ones, 9-12 - Kiddie Band, Imus; Ody Santo Domingo, 31 - Close-up Magician, Santa Mesa, Manila; Derf Cabael, 33 - Singer, Bacoor; Odette Cagandahan, 32 - Blacklight artist, Paete, Laguna; Vidad Sisters - Singing Duo, Binangonan, Rizal; Power Impact Dancers - Dance Group, Manila; Percival Denolo, 43 - mud shadow artist, Valenzuala City; Francis Anne Virtudazo, 36 - Kudiman singer, Quezon City; Next Level Octomix - Jump Rope Dancers, Caloocan; Voice Male - Male singing group, Quezon City; Rodrigo Brothers - Sibling Drummers, Balayan, Batangas; Dos Fuerte Bailarines - Dancesport Duo, Tuguegarao; P.W.R. Music - Singer/Rapper couple, Pasig; Urban Crew - Hip-hop dance group, Las Piñas; The Elite - Tribal Dance Group, Muntinlupa; Troy Perez, 27 - Mentalist, Quezon City; BSJ Drum Troops - All-Male Drum group, Las Piñas; Elektro Kids, Hovertrax performers, Quezon City; Likhain Dance Crew, Modern Folk dance group, Tondo; Lezboys - Singing group, Antipolo; Noe Bersola, 35 - Acrobat, Noveleta, Cavite; Mark Dune Basmayor, 27 - Contortionist, Cabuyao; Pizza Masters - Dough Throwing performers, Manila; Reynaldo Mape Jr., 27 - Rubik's Cube solver, Valenzuela; Cabuyao Acrobats - Acrobat group, Cabuyao; Ronel Baladad, 21 - Hulahoop performer, Nueva Vizcaya; Tito's Duo - Acrobat Duo, Quezon City; Raymond Capino, 20 - Flow blacklight performer, Lemery, Batangas; Malvar Acrobats - Acrobat group, Batangas; Team Rappa - Dance group, Tondo, Manila; Samuel Villacorta,5 - Kid Genius, Lipa; Nikki Gadiane,18 - Singer, Cavinti, Laguna; Sandugo Dance Troupe - Modern Folk dance group, Oriental Mindoro; Music Foundation - Marching band group, Dasmariñas; Bad Hair Day - All-Female band, Quezon City; Rado Delfin, 27 - Shadow play performer, Quezon City; FA Rock - Band, Binangonan, Rizal; Rhey Otic, 30 - Singer, Manila; Jezarine Linco, 19 - Singer, Valenzuala; Voices - Singing group, Quezon City; Eugene Rubio, 37 - acrobat, Talisay, Batangas; Melchizedek Bicija, 19 - Vocal impersonator, Calamba; Happy Twins, 18 - Twin Acrobats, Taguig	Auditionees from Visayas: The Simpson Tribe, 2-43 - Acrobat group, Roxas, Capiz; FA Flow Circle, 17-23 - LED TRON dance group, Cebu City; Daniel Bautista, 42 - Yoyoy Villame impersonator, Sagbayan, Bohol; The Raes, 17-43 - Mother-Daughters band, Cebu City; M.A.T.T.I., 12 - Martial arts exhibition group, Bacolod; Mastermind, 18-26 - Dance group, Borongan; Deniel Sarmiento, 15 - Dancer, Boracay; Angel Fire, 18-21 - Belly dancers, Cebu City; Dona Aguire, 52 - Singer, Kalibo; Kurt Philip Espiritu, 14 - Singer, Bacolod; Bailes de Luces - Light Dancers, Bacolod; Big One - Musician Group, Negros Occidental; Gerome Siguan, 22 - Fire pole dancer, Guiuan, Eastern Samar; Don Juan - Dance group, Cebu City; Alicia Bohol Musika Kawayan - Bamboo musicians, Bohol; Rey Mark Mijaran, 25 - Comb & paper musician, Jaro, Leyte; Jade Riccio, 26 - Singer, Puerto Princesa; DBND Dancers - Kid Ballroom dancers, Iloilo City; Rodolfo Mercado, 76 - Leaf-harp musician, Bohol; Roma Villarete, 36 - magician, Boracay; Bacolod City Electric Masskara - Light dancers, Bacolod
Auditionees from Mindanao: Gensan Contortionists, 18-25 - All-male contortionist group, General Santos; Jovanny Sumabal, 24 - Freestyle Rapper, Davao City; DM-X Comvalenoz, 18-24 - Hip-hop dance group, Nabunturan, Compostela Valley; Gian Bacalso, 22 - Freestyle drummer, Davao City; D'Gemini, 22 - Female Hip-hop dance duo, Panabo; Queen Beats, 14-15 - Female Beatbox duo, Sarangani; Luna Brothers - Dance duo, Davao City; Sto. Tomas Bulilit Generation - Kid acrobats, Santo Tomas (Davao del Norte); Legendary Fire Artists - Fire dancers, Davao City; Koro Teatrico - Comical Choir, Digos; Brian Sescon, 6 - Kid Motocross racer, Davao City; Mabini Senior Scouts - Drill Performers, Davao City; Twin Brothers - Dance/acrobatic duo, Davao City; Um Tagum Castreal Duo - Dance duo, Davao City; Father & Song - Sing/Rap duo, Iligan; Crossover Family - Hip-hop dance group, Davao City; Nique Mancha, 21 - Pole dancer, Davao City; Binibining Beats - Female beatboxer, Zamboanga City; Gensen Parkour - Parkour group, General Santos; UA Mindanao - Motocross performers, Kidapawan
Auditionees from the overseas: Joey Alberto, 20 - Dancer, California, United States
NOTE: Please be guided that the list above is incomplete.

=== Golden buzzer ===
Another new addition to this season is the golden buzzer. During the live auditions, there is a golden buzzer placed in the center of the judges' table. The buzzer is pressed by a judge on an act to send directly to the live semi-finals. Each judge is allowed to press the buzzer only once during the whole duration of the auditions.

Padilla was the first judge to use the golden buzzer, pressing it for acrobatic duo, Power Duo. Locsin was the next to press for flair bartending couple Liquid Concepts. Then Vice Ganda was the third judge to press for collegiate Hip-Hop dance troupe, Power Impact Dancers, with Garcia coming in last, doing so for hat tricker/contortionist Mark Dune Basmayor. All four were found during the Manila auditions, hence the lack of calls for the use of the Golden Buzzer during the Davao auditions.

== Judges Cull ==
There are 132 acts who made it to the Judges Cull. Out of 132 acts, only 36 will move forward to the Live Semi-Finals. There are four golden buzzer acts who instantly made it to the Semi-Finals and 27 acts were made it through the unanimous decisions of the judges. However, there are 16 acts in the waiting list who performed for the remaining five slots in the semi-finals and complete the Top 36.

=== Unanimous decision ===
These acts were chosen based on unanimous decisions by the judges to move forward to the Live Semi-Finals. Twenty-seven of these acts advanced to the live shows.

Results of Unanimous decisions
Advanced
- DM-X Comvalenoz - Hip-hop dance group
- Bailes de Luces – Light dance group
- Philip Galit - Shadow play performer
- Derf Cabael - Singer
- Rayner Dalde - Opera singer
- Santo Tomas Bulilit Generation - Kid acrobat group
- Celine Venayo - Pole dancer
- Donna Aguire - Singer
- Crossover Family - Hip-hop dance group
- Kurt Philip Espiritu - Singer/guitarist
- Lezboys - All-female singing group
- The Raes - Mother-Daughters band
- The Poor Voice - Male singing duo
- Next Option - Boy Band
- UA Mindanao - Motocross performers
- The Amazing Pyra - Fire dancer
- Legendary Fire Artists - Fire dancers
- Dino Splendid Acrobats - All-male acrobat group
- Rouge - All-female Rock band
- Splitters - Dance group
- Likhain Dance Crew - Modern folk dance group
- M.A.T.T.I. - Martial Arts exhibition group
- FA Flow Circle - LED TRON dance group
- Angel Fire - Belly dancers
- Ody Santo Domingo - Close-up Magician
- Vernon de Vera - Escape Artist
- Mastermind - Dance group

Eliminated

- Histacity – Dance Group
- Music Foundation – Marching band
- Gian Bacalso - Freestyle drummer
- Rado Delfin - Shadow play performer
- Rhey Otic - Singer
- Jezarine Linco – Singer
- The Simpson Tribe - Acrobat performers
- Super Goodie - Pep Squad duo
- Allyza Imatong - Kid Pole dancer
- Ronel Baladad - Hula-hoop performer
- Mark Mestiola - Basketball performer
- Backache Boys - Senior boy band
- X-Breaker - Hip-hop dance group
- Urban Crew - Hip-hop dance group
- Voices - Singing group
- Queen Beats - Female Beatbox duo
- Binibining Beats - Female Beatboxer
- Noe Bersola - Acrobat
- Bad Hair Day - All-female band
- FA-Rock - Band
- Team Rappa - Dance group
- The Elite - Tribal dance group
- Gerome Siguan - Fire pole dancer
- Next Level Octomix - Jump Rope dancers
- Elektro Kids - Hovertrax performers
- Sandugo Dance Troupe - Modern folk dance group
- Pizza Masters - Dough throwing performers
- Roma Villarete - Magician
- Geffrey delos Reyes - Close-up Magician
- Troy Perez - Mentalist
- Monterozo Twins - Singing/Beatbox duo
- Happy Twins - Twin acrobats
- D'Gemini - Female Hip-hop dance duo
- Eugene Rubio - Acrobat
- Reynaldo Mape Jr. - Rubik's Cube Solver
- Pamilya Kwela - Comedy Dance group
- Voice Male - Male Singing group
- Joey Alberto - Dancer
- Melchizedek Bicua - Vocal impressionist
- Daniel Bautista - Yoyoy Villame impersonator
- Rolando Parico - Beatles band parody
- Jerimiah Velasco - Singer

Footnotes

=== Standby Acts ===
The following acts who performed again for the remaining five slots.

Results of Standby Acts
Advanced
- Francis Anne Virtudazo - Kudiman singer
- Twin Brothers - Dance/acrobat duo
- Percival Denolo - Mud shadow artist
- Deniel Sarmiento - Dancer
- The Chosen Ones - Kiddie Band

Eliminated

- P.W.R. Music - Singer/rapper couple
- Jade Riccio - Singer
- Luna Brothers - Dance duo
- Raymond Capino - Flow artist
- Odette Cagandahan - Blacklight artist
- Um Tagum Castreal Duo - Dance duo
- Louie Lorenzo - Male aerialist
- Gensan Contortionists - All-male contortionist group
- Jovanny Sumabal - Freestyle rapper
- Mercy Viola Daily - Female rapper
- Micah Cate - Singer

=== Unknown decision ===
Several acts were unable to compete in the Judges Cull for personal reasons, or were not seen during the airing of the episodes. These acts were therefore automatically assumed as eliminated from the competition.

Acts eliminated at unknown stage
- Alicia Bohol Musika Kawayan - Bamboo musicians
- Bacolod city Electric Masskara - Light dancers
- Big One - Musician group
- Brian Sescon - Kid motocross racer
- Don Juan - Dance group
- Poseidon - Contemporarty marine dance group
- Mabini Senior scouts - Drill performers
- Nique Mancha - Pole dancer
- Koro Teatrico - Comical choir
- Gensan Parkour - Parkour group
- Father & Son - Sing/rap duo
- Rey Mark Mijaran - Comb & Paper musician
- DBND Dancers - Kid Ballroom dancers
- Rodolfo Mercado - Leaf-harp musician
- Samuel Villacorta - Kid Genius
- Malvar Acrobats - Acrobat group
- Nikki Gadiane - Singer
- Cabuyao Acrobats - Acrobat group
- Rodrigo brothers - Sibling drummers
- BSJ Drum troops - All-male drum group
- Vidad Sisters - Singing duo
- Tito's Duo - Acrobat group

=== Top 36 results summary ===
Color key

- Winner
- Runner-up
- Finalist
- Semi-finalist (lost judges' or public vote)
- Golden Buzzer

Name of act	Age(s)	Genre	Act	Hometown	Semifinal Week	Result
Power Duo		Dance	Contemporary Dance Duo	Angono, Rizal	4	Winner
Amazing Pyra (Marianne Madrigal)	21	Danger	Poi Dancer	Antipolo	3	Runner-up
Ody Sto. Domingo	31	Magic	Magician	Santa Mesa, Manila	4	Third place
Mastermind	18 - 26	Dance	Dance Group	Eastern Samar	2	Fourth place
Kurt Philip Espiritu	14	Music	Singer	Bacolod	6	Fifth place
Power Impact Dancers		Dance	Dance group	Manila	6	Sixth place
Crossover Family		Dance	Dance Group	Davao City	1	Seventh place
Dino Splendid Acrobats		Variety	Acrobat	Santo Tomas, Batangas	5	Eighth place
Sto. Tomas Bulilit Generation	7 - 11	Dance	Acrobatic Dance Group	Davao del Norte	2	Ninth place
UA Mindanao		Danger	Motocross Performers	Kidapawan City	3	Tenth place
The Chosen Ones	9 - 12	Music	Band	Imus, Cavite	5	Eleventh place
Next Option	18 - 20	Music	Boy Band	Davao City	1	Twelfth place
Percival Denolo	43	Variety	Mud Artist	Valenzuela City	6	Eliminated
Celine Velayo	19	Dance	Pole Dance	Parañaque	6	Eliminated
Rayner Dalde	26	Music	Tenor	San Fabian, Pangasinan	6	Eliminated
Rouge		Music	Rock Band	Quezon City	6	Eliminated
Mark Dune Bismayor	27	Variety	Hat Tricker / Contortionist	Calamba, Laguna	5	Eliminated
Dona Gomez Aguirre	53	Music	Singer	Kalibo, Aklan	5	Eliminated
Twin Brothers		Dance	Contemporary Dance Duo	Davao City	5	Eliminated
Vernon de Vera	47	Variety	Escape Artist	Marikina	5	Eliminated
DMX Comvalenoz	18 - 24	Dance	Dance Group	Compostela Valley	4	Eliminated
Francis Anne Virtudazo	36	Music	Kundiman Singer	Quezon City	4	Eliminated
M.A.T.T.I.	12	Variety	Arnis Performers	Bacolod	4	Eliminated
The Raes	17 - 53	Music	Acoustic trio	Cebu City	4	Eliminated
F.A. Flow Circle	17 - 33	Dance	Light Performance Dance Group	Cebu City	3	Eliminated
Liquid Concepts		Variety	Flairtending Duo	Quezon City	3	Eliminated
Legendary Fire Artists		Danger	Fire Artists	Davao City	3	Eliminated
Likhain Dance Troupe		Dance	Cultural Dance Troupe	Tondo, Manila	3	Eliminated
Deniel Sarmiento	15	Dance	Dancer	Boracay, Aklan	2	Eliminated
Derf Cabael	33	Music	Singer	Bacoor, Cavite	2	Eliminated
Angel Fire	18 - 21	Dance	Belly Dancing Group	Cebu City	2	Eliminated
Lezboys		Music	Singing group	Antipolo	2	Eliminated
The Poor Voice		Music	Singing Duo	Pasig	1	Eliminated
Philip Galit a.k.a. Shadow Ace	19	Variety	Shadow Play	Calatagan, Batangas	1	Eliminated
Splitters		Dance	Dance Group	Manila	1	Eliminated
Arangka La Castellana Bailes de Luces		Dance	Blacklight Performers	Negros Occidental	1	Eliminated

== Semifinals ==
The Semifinals began on April 9, 2016, in Newport Performing Arts Theater, Resorts World Manila in Pasay, Metro Manila, where five of the six semi-final rounds took place. Each week, performances from four out of six acts took place on Saturday nights, while during Sunday nights, the two remaining acts performed and the results were announced on the same night.

=== Semifinals summary ===
- Won the public vote
- Won the judges' vote (or public vote if split decision)
- Lost the judges' vote (or public vote if split decision)
- Buzzed out
- Judge's vote

==== Week 1 (April 9 & 10) ====
- Guest performers: PGT Season 1–4 winners Jovit Baldivino, Marcelito Pomoy, Maasinhon Trio & Roel Manlangit – "Posible"/"Tayo'y mga Pinoy"/"Noypi"

Contestant	Order	Act	Buzzes and judges' votes				Percentage	Result
Contestant	Order	Act	FMG	Angel	Robin	Vice	Percentage	Result
Crossover Family	1	Dance group					12.14%	Advanced
Philip Galit a.k.a. Shadow Ace	2	Shadow play performer					10.94%	Eliminated
Bailes de Luces la Castellana	3	Blacklight performers					6.23%	Eliminated
The Poor Voice	4	Singing duo					11.57%	Eliminated
Splitters	5	Dance group					8.97%	Eliminated
Next Option	6	Boy band					50.16%	Advanced

==== Week 2 (April 16 & 17) ====
- Guest performers: SI.CO.GU, Tito Cris Castro, Marvin Arquero from PGT Season 4

Contestant	Order	Act	Buzzes and judges' votes				Percentage	Result
Contestant	Order	Act	FMG	Angel	Robin	Vice	Percentage	Result
Angel Fire	1	Belly dancing group					2.96%	Eliminated
Deniel Sarmiento	2	Dancer					10.48%	Eliminated
Lezboys	3	Singing group					2.66%	Eliminated
Mastermind	4	Dance group					57.56%	Advanced
Sto. Tomas Bulilit Generation	5	Acrobatic dance group					23.18%	Advanced
Derf Cabael	6	Singer					3.16%	Eliminated

==== Week 3 (April 23 & 24) ====
- Guest performers: Bela Padilla with D' Intensity Breakers from PGT Season 4.

This particular semi-finals week was held outdoors at the MX Messiah Fairgrounds in Taytay, Rizal due to the size of stage required for UA Mindanao's performance and the dangerous nature of the fire acts. Also, the show temporarily vacated the Newport Performing Arts Theater to accommodate the finals nights of another competition program I Love OPM. Additionally, the Sunday telecast was moved from the usual early evening slot to past 9:45 pm due to the airing of the Luzon leg of the 2016 PiliPinas Debates.

Contestant	Order	Act	Buzzes and judges' votes				Percentage	Result
Contestant	Order	Act	FMG	Angel	Robin	Vice	Percentage	Result
Amazing Pyra	1	Poi dancer					34.90%	Advanced
Likhain Dance Troupe	2	Cultural dance troupe					6.36%	Eliminated
FA Flow Circle	3	Light performance dancers					6.45%	Eliminated
UA Mindanao	4	Motocross performers					45.12%	Advanced
Legendary Fire Artists	5	Fire artists					2.18%	Eliminated
Liquid Concepts	6	Flair tending duo					4.99%	Eliminated

==== Week 4 (April 30 & May 1) ====
- Guest performers: Jed Madela with PGT Season 1 semi-finalist and Asia's Got Talent season 1 finalist Gerphil Flores

The live shows returned indoors to the Newport Performing Arts Theater for this round. This round saw the first judges' vote impasse, forcing a return to the public's vote results for the second grand finalist from this round.

Contestant	Order	Act	Buzzes and judges' votes				Percentage	Result
Contestant	Order	Act	FMG	Angel	Robin	Vice	Percentage	Result
The Raes	1	Acoustic trio					2.06%	Eliminated
M.A.T.T.I.	2	Arnis performers					1.11%	Eliminated
Francis Anne Virtudazo	3	Kundiman singer					1.29%	Eliminated
Power Duo	4	Interpretative dancesport duo					57.38%	Advanced
DM-X Comvaleñoz	5	Dance group					7.76%	Eliminated
Ody Sto. Domingo	6	Magician					30.41%	Advanced

==== Week 5 (May 7 & 8) ====
- Guest performers: Erik Santos, KZ Tandingan, and Yeng Constantino (promotion of We Love OPM) with Season 4's Frankendal Fabroa

Contestant	Order	Act	Buzzes and judges' votes				Percentage	Result
Contestant	Order	Act	FMG	Angel	Robin	Vice	Percentage	Result
Vernon de Vera	1	Escape Artist					4.79%	Eliminated
Twin Brothers	2	Contemporary dance duo					5.89%	Eliminated
Dona Gomez Aguirre	3	Singer					3.58%	Eliminated
Dino Splendid Acrobats	4	Acrobatic group					13.32%	Advanced
The Chosen Ones	5	Band					39.94%	Advanced
Mark Dune Bismayor	6	Hat tricker / Contortionist					32.48%	Eliminated

Robin chose not to reveal his vote as the Dino Splendid Acrobats had already accumulated three votes.

==== Week 6 (May 14 & 15) ====
- Guests: #Hashtags (from It's Showtime)

Contestant	Order	Act	Buzzes and judges' votes				Percentage	Result
Contestant	Order	Act	FMG	Angel	Robin	Vice	Percentage	Result
Power Impact Dancers	1	Dance group					15.05%	Advanced
Rayner Dalde	2	Tenor					2.12%	Eliminated
Percival Denolo	3	Mud artist					13.79%	Eliminated
Rouge	4	Rock band					5.07%	Eliminated
Celine Velayo	5	Pole dancer					9.33%	Eliminated
Kurt Philip Espiritu	6	Singer					54.64%	Advanced

== Grand Finals ==
The live shows of the grand finale premiered at the Mall of Asia Arena over a span of two nights, the performance night (May 21) and the results night (May 22). For the first time in Pilipinas Got Talent, the winner was based from the public votes (50%) and the scores of the judges (50%).

UA Mindanao and the Amazing Pyra each held the outdoor parts of their performances a few days in advance at the MX Messiah Fairgrounds in Taytay, Rizal. Robin and Vice Ganda were personally present during those performances.

Color key

- Winner
- Runner-up
- Golden Buzzer

Contestant	Order	Act	Buzzes				Percentage	Result
Contestant	Order	Act	FMG	Angel	Robin	Vice	Percentage	Result
Crossover Family	1	Dance group					46.81%	7th
The Chosen Ones	2	Band					44.23%	11th
UA Mindanao	3	Motocross performers					45.90%	10th
Kurt Philip Espiritu	4	Singer					47.97%	5th
Dino Splendid Acrobats	5	Acrobatic group					46.77%	8th
Mastermind	6	Dance group					50.02%	4th
Ody Sto. Domingo	7	Magician					50.61%	3rd
Sto. Tomas Bulilit Generation	8	Acrobatic dance group					46.26%	9th
Next Option	9	Boy band					42.93%	12th
Amazing Pyra	10	Fire poi dancer					66.57%	2nd
Power Impact Dancers	11	Dance group					47.12%	6th
Power Duo	12	Interpretative dancesport duo					100.00%	1st
