= Power Duo =

Philippine dance duo

Power Duo during their performance on America's Got Talent: All-Stars, January 2023

Power Duo is a dance duo in the Philippines. The group was known as the grand winner in the fifth season of the Philippine Got Talent franchise.

== Background ==
The Power Duo is composed of real-life couple Anjanette and Gervin from Angono, Rizal. Starting out as friends on the show they started dating after their emotional audition. Their audition made Judge Robin Padilla hit the golden buzzer which sent them directly to semi-finals. Their semi-finals interpretation of Wag Ka Nang Umiyak also impressed the Judges and viewers receiving more than half of the public votes, paving the way to their Grand Finals appearance.

The Duo's evident chemistry on-and-off the stage won over most of the judges and viewers. They garnered a 100% of votes from viewers and judges to be declared winner of the Pilipinas Got Talent season 5 and took home the grand prize of ₱2 million. They are the first dance act to be named grand winner, where the winners of the first four seasons are all singers.

== Reception ==
Their Grand Finals performance of interpretative dance to the OPM ballad "Ikaw Lamang" received a standing ovation from all four judges as well as 100 percent of votes from viewers and judges.

The performance garnered praises from the judges with Vice Ganda saying to the couple

"Sa mundong punong puno ng napakaraming taong nananakit, pinaniwala niyo ulit ako sa pag-ibig. That was not just dance, that was love. And tonight love wins."

— Vice Ganda, Pilipinas Got Talent Season 5 Grand Finals

Freddie M. Garcia added that he was completely amazed at how the duo did their performance making him speechless. While Robin Padilla had this to say to the couple: "When love talks, everybody listens. Love conquers all, sabi nga nila. Power Duo, you are the Helen of Troy of 'Pilipinas Got Talent'. Panalo na kayo."

== Post-PGT ==
After winning Pilipinas Got Talent, the couple said they were preparing for international competitions, such as Asia's Got Talent, where they finished third place.

In 2019, the couple performed as part of Team Vhong-Mariel during It's Showtime's Magpasikat 2019.

In 2023, the couple participated in America’s Got Talent: All-Stars, where they finished as finalists.

== See also ==
- Pilipinas Got Talent (season 5)
- Jovit Baldivino
- Marcelito Pomoy
- Maasinhon Trio

Awards and achievements
| Preceded by Roel Manlangit | Pilipinas Got Talent; 2016 (season 5) | Succeeded by Kristel de Catalina |
