= Pilipinas Got Talent season 2 =

Pilipinas Got Talent
- Season 2
- Hosted by: Billy Crawford; Luis Manzano
- Judges: Freddie M. Garcia; Kris Aquino; Ai-Ai de las Alas
- Winner: Marcelito Pomoy
- Runner-up: Happy Feet
- No. of episodes: 35

Release
- Original network: ABS-CBN
- Original release: February 26 – June 26, 2011

Season chronology
- ← Previous; Season 1 Next → Season 3

The second season of Pilipinas Got Talent premiered on ABS-CBN from February 26 to June 26, 2011, replacing Star Power.

Billy Crawford and Luis Manzano returned as hosts for the season, while Marc Abaya, the presenter of Got More Talent, did not reprise his role. Freddie M. Garcia, Kris Aquino, and Ai-Ai delas Alas also returned as jury members.

Judges and host of Pilipinas Got Talent season 2

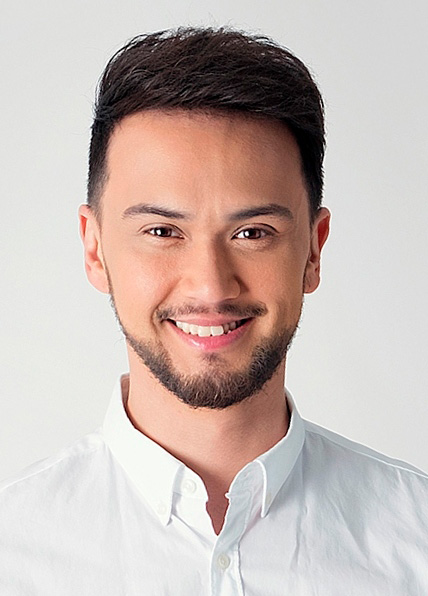
Billy Crawford (host)

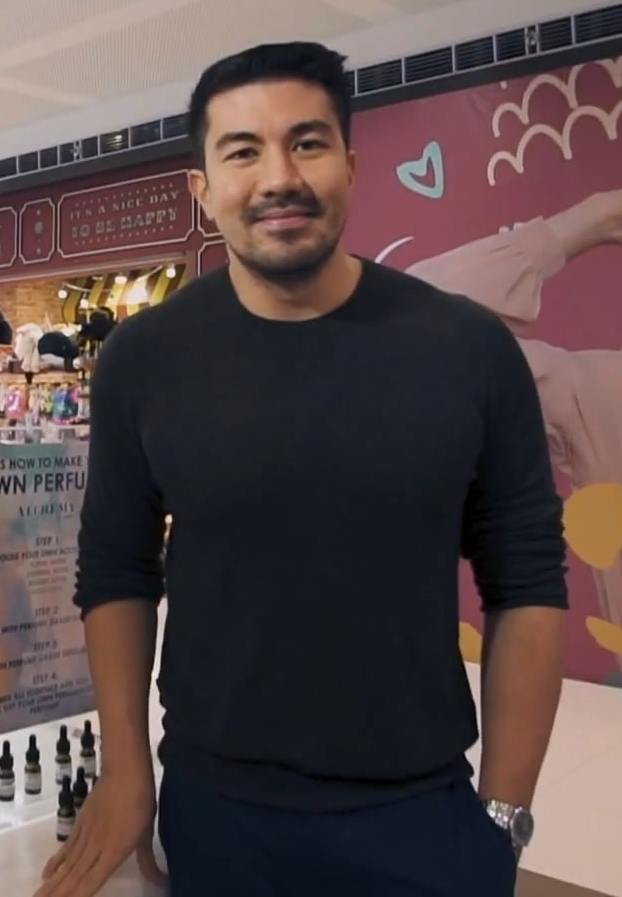
Luis Manzano (host)

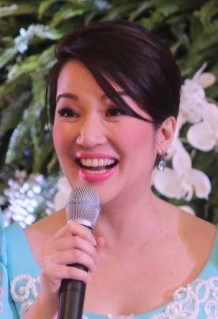
Kris Aquino

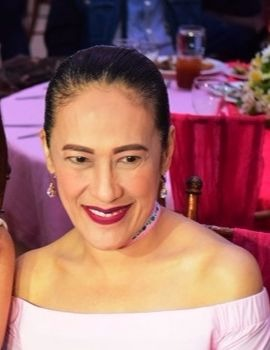
Ai-Ai de las Alas

Marcelito Pomoy, a 26-year-old falsetto singer from Imus, Cavite, was crowned the season's winner. Tap-dancing duo Happy Feet from Bukidnon finished as the runner-up, while the dance crew Freestylers from Calamba, Laguna secured third place. This marked the second consecutive season where a singer emerged as the winner.

== Auditions ==
Cities where the major auditions were held.

The auditions for the second season takes place in key cities in the Philippines. Major auditions are held in Cebu, Davao, Naga, Batangas, Dagupan and Metro Manila where the hopefuls are judged by Kris Aquino, Ai-Ai de las Alas and Freddie "FMG" Garcia. Also, micro-auditions are also held in other cities including Laoag, Tuguegarao, Baguio, Nueva Ecija, Olongapo, Pampanga, Laguna, Lucena, Legazpi City, Roxas City, Bacolod, Cagayan de Oro, and General Santos and judged by the staff of Pilipinas Got Talent.

Date of Audition	Audition Venue	City
December 1 & 2, 2010	Cebu Institute of Technology – University	Cebu City, Cebu
December 4 & 5, 2010	Philippine Women's University Davao	Davao City, Davao del Sur
December 11 & 12, 2010	Camarines Sur Polytechnic Colleges	Naga City, Camarines Sur
December 15 & 16, 2010	Lyceum-Northwestern University	Dagupan
December 18 & 19, 2010	ABS-CBN Compound	Quezon City, Metro Manila
January 13 & 14, 2011	University of Mindanao	Davao City, Davao del Sur
January 17, 2011	University of Batangas	Batangas City, Batangas
February 22, 2011	Tanghalang Pasigueño	Pasig, Metro Manila

Successful Auditionees
- Bukidnon State University Brass Band - Brass Band, Bukidnon
- Herold Suarez, 29 - Singer, Davao City
- Jeremie Tampoy, 29 - Singer and Pianist, Davao del Sur
- Angel Calalas, 21 - Hula Hoop Tricker, Cainta, Rizal
- Happy Feet - Tap Dancing Duo, Bukidnon
- Larvae - Acrobatics group, Digos
- Rhythmic Illusions - Martial Arts Dance Troupe, Davao City
- Brian Brady, 10 - Singer, Laoag, Ilocos Norte
- Romarico Sanorjo "Rico the Magician", 60 - Magician, Caloocan
- Kervy Salazar, 19 - Beatboxer, Davao City
- Marcelito Pomoy, 25 - Singer, Imus, Cavite
- Jonathan Bocay, 32 - Singer, Jaro, Iloilo City
- Rafael Pavia, 5 - Singer, Davao City
- Franceska Abigail Basalo, 7 - Belly Dancer, Cagayan de Oro
- Virgilio Del Carmen, 28 - Singer and Impressionist, Cebu City
- Freestylers - Dance Troupe, Calamba
- B4 - Dance Troupe, Baguio
- Joy's Divas - Singing Trio, Batangas
- Fernan Santuyo "Madonna Pianista", 24 - Pianist, Albay
- Male Attraction - Dance Troupe, Taguig City
- Jeremiah Velasco, 28 - Singer, Imus, Cavite
- Kevin James Sisco, 20 - Singer, San Francisco, California, U.S.
- Jose Emmanuel Cubil, 17 - Singer and Musician, Talisay City, Cebu
- Suwahib Samplidan, 31 - Singer, Davao City
- Bourbon Duo - Pole Dancing Duo, Makati
- Madrigal Siblings - Singing Trio, Cainta, Rizal
- Pearl Angelie Portuguez, 16 - Declamator, Negros Occidental
- Buildex Pagales, 15 - Singer and Musician, Digos
- Dennis Capistrano, 25 - Singer and Voice Impersonator, Camarines Sur
- Karinyoso Boys - Dance Troupe and Comedians, Dumaguete
- Leoniel Enopia and Elizabeth Dazo - Ballroom Dancing Duo, Bacolod
- New X People - Dance Troupe, Caloocan
- Mandaue City School for the Arts Dance Company - Interpretative Dance Troupe, Mandaue City, Cebu
- Funkadelics Dance Masters - Dance Troupe, Santa Rosa, Laguna
- Pardo Elementary School Dancing Rondalla - Rondalla / Stringed Instruments Ensemble, Talisay City, Cebu
- Miguel Banilad, 40 - Singer, Davao City
- Ariel Talion, 45 - Singer, Catanduanes
- Kenny Padalla, 23 - Singer, Baguio
- Actub Sisters - Singing Trio, Iligan City, Lanao del Norte
- Haide Andes, 40 - Declamator / Actress, Camarines Sur
- Skeights - Band, Davao City
- Koreen Medina, 15 - Singer, Quezon City
- Next Generation Band - Band Troupe, Davao del Norte
- Evarcosa Siblings - Ballroom Dancing Duo, Cebu City
- CK Sisters - Singing Trio
- Lunaria Brothers Marionette Show - Puppeteers, Antipolo
- Nelmhar Tabat, 14 - Breakdancer, Davao del Norte
- Sol and Ben "Light Gauge Acoustic" - Acoustic Duo, Bacolod
- Justin Mae Aguilar - Miss Saigon (acting and singing), Legazpi City
- Jommarie Haboc and Mark Angelo Del Rosario - Ad Spinners, Mandaluyong
- John Neil Roa, 10 - Beatboxer and Dancer, Cebu City
- Kidz Band - Band, Tagum City, Davao del Norte
- Venchan Tribe - Band, Naga City
- First Peter Acoustic - Acoustic Band, Batangas City
- Maribeth Callanta, 19 - Singer, Dagupan
- Ainah Frez, 17 - Singer, Laoag, Ilocos Norte
- The Baby Boomers Band - Band, Davao City
- The Cousins - Acapella Singing Group, Davao City
- Percurhythmu Band - Percussion Band, Cebu
- Filogram - Dance Troupe, Baguio
- Genevieve Arandia, 19 - Singer, Las Piñas
- Claudine Matias, 19 - Singer, Tacloban City, Leyte
- Abigail Mendoza, 22 - Singer, Camarines Sur
- Rovee Fernandez, 17 - Singer, Lapu-Lapu City, Cebu
- Universal Dance Crew - Interpretative Dancing Duo, Davao City
- Mark Kenneth Dolom, 17 - Sand Artist, Puerto Princesa City, Palawan
- Jake Juleous Gacan, 21 - Violinist, Toledo, Cebu
- Elpmis Gnal - Dance Troupe and Cap Trickers, Taguig City
- Zander Xyril De Ocampo, 8 - Singer Lucena City, Quezon
- First Beat Effect - Beatbox Troupe, Bacolod
- Dance Selection - Cheerleading and Acrobatics Dance Troupe, Taguig City
- Henry Cardenete, 36 - Magician, Legazpi City, Albay
- Myrasol Bacarisas, 31 - Singer, Cebu City
- Kapidamu Band - Band Troupe, Atimonan, Quezon
- Upstream Acoustic - Acoustic Duo, Bacolod
- Jett Barun, 22 - Singer, Pateros
- Magis Percuzions - Percussion Instruments Quartet, Naga City
- Annie Kate Astillero, 17 - Singer and Musician, Legazpi City, Albay
- Kristian Buno, 20 - One Man Band, Batangas
- Romeo Rosalita, 35 - Singer, Davao City
- Marc Robin Orbita & Jan Almer Sabater - Singing Duo and Brass Instrumentalists, Naga City
- John Leo Moywela, 28 - Singer, Zamboanga del Sur
- Arenzo Ruel Blacas, 15 - Breakdancer, Cagayan de Oro
- Eonian Dream Talents - Interpretative Dance Troupe, Camiling, Tarlac
- May Obando, 19 - Singer, Ormoc, Leyte
- Agnes Lunar, 29 - Singer, Manila
- Ian Abraham, 21 - Singer, Pasig
- Romeo Roa Jr., 38 - Singer, Southern Leyte
- Collins Gutierrez, 24 - Singer, San Pedro, Laguna
- Roland and Rovince Monteroza, 11 - Singing Duo / Twins, Las Piñas
- Eloisa Invento, 14 - Singer, Iloilo
- Paula Abello, 15 - Singer, Cebu
- Glenn Angeles, 39 - Yoyo Tricker, Quezon City
- Side FX - Dance Troupe, Naga City
- Mahal Martinez, 30 - Singer, Talisay City, Cebu
- R.V. Kidz Style - Dance Troupe, General Santos
- Temptations - Dance Troupe, Tacloban City
- BSU Filipina - Dance Troupe, Malaybalay, Bukidnon
- Justin Piñon, 25 - Mentalist, Antipolo
- Disciples of Purely Panaboans - Rappers, Panabo, Davao del Norte
- The Radicals - Band Troupe, Dagupan
- Zaldy Carlos, 38 - Singer, Manila
- Richelio Fiel, 22 - Dancer / Lipsyncer, Compostela Valley
- Superstar - Dance Troupe, Cebu City
- Jhommel Medina and Jesselyn Cortez - Ballroom Dancing Duo, Mangaldan, Pangasinan
- Kabuntatala Dance Squad - Folk Dance Troupe, Pangasinan
- Paul John Villanueva, 18 - Singer, Lipa City
- Ma. Gereberne Lozada, 16 - Singer, Roxas City, Capiz
- Exquizyth - Dance Troupe, General Santos
- Jacqueline Schubert, 20 - Singer, Cebu
- Gracelle and Kristel Lapinid - Singing Duo, Cotabato
- Nicole Marie Parada, 21 - Singer, Batangas City
- Grace Anne Caldez, 22 - Singer, Dagupan
- Bruce Christian Osorio, 17 - Singer, Davao City
- Johnny Regana, 7 - Singer, Cagayan de Oro
- Agnes Ignacio, 57 - Pianist, Romblon
- Emmanuel Gallarde, 20 - Singer, Tuburan, Cebu
- Ultimate Hiphop - Dance Troupe, San Pascual, Batangas
- The Asidors - Band, Davao City
- V.I.P. Singers - Chorale Group, Camarines Sur
- Jan Andrew Denilla, 22 - Visual Artist, Davao City
- Gino Janducayan, 23 - Magician, Davao City
- Michelle Elaine Paredes, 16 - Singer and Guitarist, Misamis Oriental, Cagayan de Oro
- Amanak - Singing Duo, Quezon City
- Beyond Expression - Band, Quezon City
- DJP Trio - Singing Trio, Bacolod
- Jonathan Soquite, 31 - Singer, Davao City
- He... He... He... - Dancing Trio, Davao City
- Alfredo Mosino, 52 - Singer, Compostela Valley
- Erwin Camases, 20 - Singer, Guinobatan, Albay
- Christian "Krissy" Rendon, 28 - Singer, Pasig
- Jeffrey Bryan Brucal, 20 - Beatboxer, Bacoor, Cavite
- Marsman National High School Dance Troupe - Folk Dancing Troupe Santo Tomas, Davao del Sur
- Rico De Guzman, 59- Leaf Player, La Union
- Rodnick Santos, 20 - Saxophonist, Malolos, Bulacan
- Ed Aniel, 41 - Pole Dancer, Surigao del Norte
- Danceport Junior Group, 6 - 12 - Ballroom Dancing Troupe, Cebu City
- Reinalou Cabardo, 23 - Singer, Taguig
- Jan Michael Narag, 16 - Singer, Mabini, Pangasinan
- Anselmo Maputi, 92 - Singer, Butuan

== Judges Cull ==
After the nationwide auditions, 174 acts made it to the Judges Cull where the judges select the top 36 semi-finalists. The Judges Cull for Luzon and Visayas auditions were held at Dolphy Theater in ABS-CBN where 26 acts made it to the semi-finals. On the other hand, the remaining 10 acts from Mindanao were personally visited by the judges in their hometown to inform the news that they are qualified for the semi-finals.

=== Top 36 Results Summary ===
Color Key

- Winner
- Runner-up
- Finalist
- Semi-finalist (lost judges' vote) and Wild Card contestant
- Wild Card Act

Name of act	Age(s)	Genre	Act	Hometown	Semifinal Week	Result
Marcelito Pomoy	26	Singing	Falsetto Singer	Imus, Cavite	6	Winner
Happy Feet	21 & 12	Dancing	Tap dancing duo	Bukidnon	3	Runner-up
Freestylers	—	Dancing	Dance crew	Calamba	1	Third place
B4	—	Dancing	Dance crew	Baguio	2	Fourth place
Buildex Pagales	15	Singing	Singer	Digos	5	Fifth place
NielBeth	—	Dancing	Ballroom dancing duo	Bacolod	6	Sixth place
Rico the Magician	60	Magic	Magician	Caloocan	1	Seventh place
John Michael Narag	16	Singing	Singer	Mabini, Pangasinan	4	Eighth place
Madrigal Siblings	11 - 16	Singing	Singing trio	Cainta, Rizal	1	Ninth place
Skeights	—	Music	Band	Davao City	2	Tenth place
Jose Emmanuel "Jem" Cubil	17	Singing	Singer	Talisay City, Cebu	3	Eleventh place
DJP Trio	10	Singing	Singing trio	Negros Occidental	5	Twelfth place
Angel Calalas	22	Variety	Hula Hoop tricker	Cainta, Rizal	2	Thirteenth Place
Filogram	—	Dancing	Dance crew	Baguio	4	Fourteenth Place
Joy's Divas	17 - 18	Singing	Singing trio	Batangas	6	Wild card
Kapidamu Band^{2}	11 - 17	Music	Band	Quezon	6	Eliminated
Larvae	17 - 20	Acrobatics	Acrobatics group / Contortionists	Digos	6	Eliminated
Suwahib Samplidan	31	Singing	Peanut-eating singer	Davao City	6	Eliminated
Kenny Padalla	23	Singing	Singer	Baguio	5	Wild card
Bourbon Duo^{1}	23	Dancing	Pole dancer	Makati	5	Eliminated
Jacqueline Schubert	20	Singing	Singer	Cebu City	5	Eliminated
Karinyoso Boys	—	Dancing	Comedic dance crew	Dumaguete	5	Eliminated
Next Generation Band	7 - 14	Music	Band	Davao del Norte	4	Wild card
First Beat Effect	—	Music	Beatboxing quartet	Bacolod	4	Eliminated
Genevieve Rochelle "Ivy" Arandia	20	Singing	Singer	Las Piñas	4	Eliminated
Maribeth Callanta	19	Singing	Singer	Dagupan	4	Eliminated
Collins Gutierrez	24	Singing	Singer	San Pedro, Laguna	3	Wild card
Dance Selection	—	Dancing	Cheerdancers / Acrobatics troupe	Taguig City	3	Eliminated
Rafael Pavia	5	Singing	Singer	Davao City	3	Eliminated
Zaldy Carlos	38	Singing	Singer	Manila	3	Eliminated
Lapinid Sisters	14 & 11	Singing	Singing duo	Cotabato	2	Eliminated
Madonna Pianista	24	Music	Pianist	Albay	2	Eliminated
Virgilio del Carmen	28	Singing	Impressionist / Singer	Cebu City	2	Eliminated
Brian Brady	10	Singing	Singer	Laoag City	1	Eliminated
Jeremie Tampoy	29	Singing	Singer / Pianist	Davao City	1	Eliminated
Light Gauge Acoustic	—	Singing	Acoustic duo	Bacolod	1	Eliminated

^1 Only one half of the Bourbon Duo appeared on stage; the other half was injured during rehearsals.
^2 The Kapidamu Band was among the previous season's second group of semi-finalists, taking third place; they lost the Judges' Choice vote to Markki Stroem . The rule that allowed auditioners from previous seasons to reaudition seemingly extends to include unsuccessful semi-finalists and those who did not pass the Judges' Cull in their seasons, thus paving the way for the band's return to the semi-finals this season.

== Live shows ==
=== Semi-finals ===
The semi-finals was held in PAGCOR Grand Theater in Casino Filipino, Parañaque City where the 36 acts competed in six weeks for the twelve slots in the Finals. Every week, two acts will make it to the Finals through public vote and judges' vote.

Color key

- Won the public vote
- Won the judges' vote
- Lost the judges' vote
- Buzzed out
- Judge's vote

==== Week 1 (April 30 & May 1) ====
Contestant	Order	Act	Buzzes and judges' votes			Percentage	Result
Contestant	Order	Act	FMG	Kris	Ai-ai	Percentage	Result
Freestylers	1	Dance crew				46.32%	Advanced
Brian Brady	2	Singer				7.80%	Eliminated
Light Gauge Acoustic (Sol & Ven)	3	Acoustic duo				4.36%	Eliminated
Madrigal Siblings	4	Singing trio				14.11%	Advanced
Jeremie Tampoy	5	Singer/Pianist				5.09%	Eliminated
Rico the Magician	6	Magician				22.31%	Wild Card

==== Week 2 (May 7 & 8) ====
Contestant	Order	Act	Buzzes and judges' votes			Percentage	Result
Contestant	Order	Act	FMG	Kris	Ai-ai	Percentage	Result
Virgilio del Carmen	1	Impressionist / Singer				2.54%	Eliminated
B4	2	Dance crew				51.47%	Advanced
Lapinid Sisters	3	Singing duo				4.75%	Eliminated
Madonna Pianista	4	Pianist				2.83%	Eliminated
Skeights	5	Band				14.40%	Wild Card
Angel Calalas	6	Hula Hoop Tricker				24.00%	Advanced

==== Week 3 (May 14 & 15) ====
Contestant	Order	Act	Buzzes and judges' votes			Percentage	Result
Contestant	Order	Act	FMG	Kris	Ai-ai	Percentage	Result
Dance Selection	1	Cheerdancers / Acrobatics troupe				4.86%	Eliminated
Jose Emmanuel "Jem" Cubil	2	Singer				23.20%	Advanced
Rafael Pavia	3	Singer				3.74%	Eliminated
Zaldy Carlos	4	Singer				2.28%	Eliminated
Collins Gutierrez	5	Singer				15.40%	Wild Card
Happy Feet	6	Tap Dancing duo				50.51%	Advanced

==== Week 4 (May 21 & 22) ====
Contestant	Order	Act	Buzzes and judges' votes			Percentage	Result
Contestant	Order	Act	FMG	Kris	Ai-ai	Percentage	Result
Filogram	1	Dance crew				27.09%	Advanced
Maribeth Callanta	2	Singer				6.06%	Eliminated
Genevieve Rochelle "Ivy" Arandia	3	Singer				5.47%	Eliminated
First Beat Effect	4	Beatboxing group				7.48%	Eliminated
Next Generation Band	5	Band				22.04%	Wild Card
John Michael Narag	6	Singer				31.85%	Advanced

==== Week 5 (May 28 & 29) ====
Contestant	Order	Act	Buzzes and judges' votes			Percentage	Result
Contestant	Order	Act	FMG	Kris	Ai-ai	Percentage	Result
Jacqueline Schubert	1	Singer				3.66%	Eliminated
Karinyoso Boys	2	Comedians / Dance Crew				6.75%	Eliminated
Kenny Padalla	3	Singer				10.33%	Wild Card
Ariana of the Bourbon Duo	4	Pole Dancer				4.91%	Eliminated
DJP Trio	5	Singing Trio				47.36%	Advanced
Buildex Pagales	6	Singer				26.99%	Advanced

==== Week 6 (June 4 & 5) ====
Contestant	Order	Act	Buzzes and judges' votes			Percentage	Result
Contestant	Order	Act	FMG	Kris	Ai-ai	Percentage	Result
Joy's Divas	1	Singing trio				28.58%	Wild Card
NielBeth (Leoniel Enopia & Elizabeth Dazo)	2	Ballroom dancing duo				34.06%	Advanced
Kapidamu Band	3	Band				5.96%	Eliminated
Suwahib Samplidan	4	Peanut-eating singer				3.20%	Eliminated
Larvae	5	Acrobatics troupe / Contortionists				4.49%	Eliminated
Marcelito Pomoy	6	Singer				23.71%	Advanced

=== Wild Card Round ===
While this season's semi-final went through the same procedure are the previous season, this season introduced the wild card round in which the judges' vote losers in the first six rounds were given a second chance to compete for two more spots in the Finals. Finalists selected from the wild card round would entirely be determined by public vote; this section only covers buzz-outs since the judges' observations and comments would not largely affect the outcome of the voting. Voting procedure is slightly different is this round; in the results night, the top 3 compete in a second round of performances and voting from which the top two would advance to the Finals.

The wild card round was announced near the end of the sixth semi-finals round and was held on June 11 and 12, 2011. This was also the first time in the entire Got Talent franchise that wild card competitors were given a chance to have spots in the finale.

Color Key:

- Won the public vote (Round 2)
- Lost the public vote (Round 2)
- Won the public vote (Round 1)
- Buzzed out

==== Round 1 (June 11) ====
Contestant	Semifinal Week	Act	Buzzes			Percentage	Result
Contestant	Semifinal Week	Act	FMG	Kris	Ai-ai	Percentage	Result
Joy's Divas	6	Singing trio				unrevealed^{1}	Top 3
Kenny Padalla	5	Singer				18.42%	Eliminated
Next Generation Band	4	Band				8.17%	Eliminated
Collins Gutierrez	3	Singer				4.23%	Eliminated
Skeights	2	Band				unrevealed^{1}	Top 3
Rico the Magician	1	Magician				unrevealed^{1}	Top 3

^1The top 3 got 25.54%, 22.31%, and 21.33% of the Round 1 vote respectively. However, which act got what percentage was never revealed as they were called out "in no particular order."

==== Round 2 (June 12) ====
Contestant	Semifinal Week	Act	Buzzes			Percentage	Result
Contestant	Semifinal Week	Act	FMG	Kris	Ai-ai	Percentage	Result
Joy's Divas	6	Singing trio				28.15%	Eliminated
Skeights	2	Band				30.16%	Advanced
Rico the Magician (Romarico Sanorjo)	1	Magician				41.68%	Advanced

=== Finals ===
The Finals was held at the Araneta Coliseum on June 25–26, 2011. Twelve acts from the Semi-Finals round and Wild Card winners performed again to win the title of the second Pilipinas Got Talent winner. A week before the Finals, two special episodes called "The Road to the Finals" was aired, profiling the fourteen Finalists. For the performance night, Nikki Gil took co-hosting duties from Luis Manzano, who was having another commitment at the time.

Another change for the Finals was the limits in public voting. A user of one SIM card number or e-mail address could only give up to 30 or 32 votes (depending on the method of voting) to a single act per day to ensure fairness.

==== Performances ====
- Winner
- Runner-up
- Third place
- Wild Card Act

Contestant	Order	Act	Performance Description	Buzzes			Percentage	Result
Contestant	Order	Act	Performance Description	FMG	Kris	Ai-ai	Percentage	Result
Freestylers	1	Dance crew	Performed a multitrack dance and stunts performance, including a 12-foot dismount and somersault.				9.46%	3rd
DJP Trio	2	Singing Trio	Sang "You'll Always Be My Number One" by Vernie Varga.				2.60%	12th
Happy Feet	3	Tap dancing duo	Performed a tap dancing routine to the tune of "Close to You" by Whigfield.				18.32%	2nd
John Michael Narag	4	Singer	Sang "Kahit Isang Saglit" by Martin Nievera.				5.30%	8th
B4	5	Dance crew	Performed a multitrack popping routine, using "I Gotta Feeling," "Boom Boom Pow," and "The Time (Dirty Bit)" by The Black Eyed Peas, "OMG" by Usher, "Nothin' on You" by B.o.B and Bruno Mars, and "Fire" by 2NE1.				9.13%	4th
Rico the Magician	6	Magician	Magic performance involving driving his wife and assistant through a spike and magically catching two geese, one of which transformed into a 70-pound python.				7.59%	7th
Madrigal Siblings	7	Singing trio	Sang a patriotic medley composed of "Bayan Ko," "Dakilang Lahi," and "Magkaisa."				3.68%	9th
Marcelito Pomoy	8	Singer	Sang both male and female parts of "The Prayer" by Andrea Bocelli and Celine Dion distinctly.				19.56%	1st
Filogram	9	Dance crew	Performed a multitrack dance routine, mainly using "Push It" by Salt-n-Pepa and "Stayin' Alive" by the Bee Gees.				0.40%	14th
Buildex Pagales	10	Singer	Sang "The Lazy Song" by Bruno Mars				8.25%	5th
NielBeth (''Leoniel Enopia & Elizabeth Dazo'')	11	Ballroom dancing duo	Performed a salsa and cha cha dance routine to the tune of "Let's Get Loud" by Jennifer Lopez, highlighted by an impromptu costume change in the middle.				7.81%	6th
Jose Emmanuel "Jem" Cubil	12	Singer	Sang "Have You Ever Really Loved A Woman" by Bryan Adams.				2.86%	11th
Skeights	13	Band	Performed "Liwanag sa Dilim" by Rivermaya.				3.04%	10th
Angel Calalas	14	Hula hoop tricker	Twirled flaming hula hoops and multiple hula hoops and spun herself while hanging upside-down, all to the tune of "One Night Only" from the musical Dreamgirls.				1.99%	13th

== National Ratings ==
Pilipinas Got Talent Season 2 hits all-time high 38.2% national rating.
The National Ratings came from the whole-wide Philippine coverage of TV audience ratings from Kantar Media Philippines.

Show	Date	Share	Rank ( Night / Primetime )	Source
1st Audition	February 26	29.5%	1	
2nd Audition	February 27	27.6%	1	
3rd Audition	March 5	31.3%	2	
4th Audition	March 6	31.7%	1	
5th Audition	March 12	29.3%	1	
6th Audition	March 13	28%	1	
7th Audition	March 19	30.5%	1	
8th Audition	March 20	32.1%	1	
9th Audition	March 26	27.4%	1	
10th Audition	March 27	30.7%	1	
11th Audition	April 2	31.9%	2	
12th Audition	April 3	31.4%	1	
13th Audition	April 9	27.8%	2	
14th Audition	April 10	29.6%	1	
15th Audition	April 16	30.3%	2	
16th Audition	April 17	32%	1	
Judges' Cull	April 24	22.9%	1	
Semi-finals 1 (Performance Night)	April 30	27.5%	2	
Semi-finals 1 (Results Night)	May 1	22.4%	2	
Semi-finals 2 (Performance Night)	May 7	24.7%	2	
Semi-finals 2 (Results Night)	May 8	18.3%	4	
Semi-finals 3 (Performance Night)	May 14	25%	2	
Semi-finals 3 (Results Night)	May 15	21.7%	1	
Semi-finals 4 (Performance Night)	May 21	24.1%	2	
Semi-finals 4 (Results Night)	May 22	24.5%	1	
Semi-finals 5 (Performance Night)	May 28	25.7%	2	
Semi-finals 5 (Results Night)	May 29	26%	1	
Semi-finals 6 (Performance Night)	June 4	25.4%	2	
Semi-finals 6 (Results Night)	June 5	26.1%	1	
Wild Card Week (Performance Night)	June 11	23%	2	
Wild Card Week (Results Night)	June 12	23.9%	1	
The Road to Finals 1	June 18			
The Road to Finals 2	June 19			
Finals (Performance Night)	June 25	34.5%	1	
Finals (Results Night)	June 26	38.2%	1	
