= Kristel de Catalina =

Filipina dancer (born 1985)

- Born: Kristel de Catalina; June 29, 1985 (age 41); Antipolo, Rizal, Philippines
- Occupations: Dancer, Actress
- Years active: 2017–present
- Known for: Pilipinas Got Talent 6 winner 2017 Asian Aerial Dance Art Competition
- Website: Kristel de Catalina on Instagram

Kristel de Catalina (born June 29, 1985 in Antipolo, Rizal, Philippines) is a Filipino dancer and actress. She was the sixth grand winner of Pilipinas Got Talent franchise along with Julius Obrero, Rhea Marquez & Joven Olvido.

== Personal life ==
She was born and raised in Antipolo, Rizal. She is known for winning the 2017 Air Stars, Asian Aerial Dance Art Competition. Later she auditioned in PGT 6.

== Filmography ==
=== Film ===
- Supahpapalicious - 2008, (cameo role)

== See also ==
- Pilipinas Got Talent (season 6)
- Jovit Baldivino
- Marcelito Pomoy
- Maasinhon Trio
- Power Duo

Awards and achievements
Preceded by Power Duo	Pilipinas Got Talent; 2018 (season 6)	Succeeded by Incumbent
