= Freddie M. Garcia =

Filipino media executive (born 1944)

Freddie M. García

President, ABS-CBN (Broadcasting) Corporation
- In office May 26, 1997 – December 31, 2003
- Preceded by: Eugenio Lopez III
- Succeeded by: Luis F. Alejandro

Personal details
- Born: Federico M. García; July 13, 1944 (age 82) Manila, Philippines
- Education: University of the Philippines Diliman
- Occupation: Co-founder, Star Magic; Judge, Pilipinas Got Talent

Federico "Freddie" M. García (Tagalog pronunciation: [gaɾˈsɪa]; born July 13, 1944), also known as FMG, is a Filipino business executive who served as President of ABS-CBN Corporation, the largest media conglomerate in the Philippines, from May 26, 1997 to December 31, 2003, and one of the four co-founders of Star Magic.

== Personal life ==
García attended the College of Business Administration at the University of the Philippines Diliman.

== Career ==
García began his career with ABS-CBN as sales executive in 1966 until 1972, when the network was shut down following the declaration of Martial law in the Philippines. He then moved to GMA Radio Television Arts from 1974 to 1986.

García rejoined ABS-CBN in 1987 as Executive Vice-President and General Manager. He became its president and chief operating officer in 1998 until 2003. He rejoined ABS-CBN as a board director and management consultant in 2006.

== Pilipinas Got Talent ==
In 2010, García joined as a judge of Pilipinas Got Talent until midway to its sixth season. In 2025, Garcia returned as a judge for the seventh season.

== See also ==
- ABS-CBN Corporation
- Star Magic
- Pilipinas Got Talent
- Charo Santos-Concio
- GMA Network Inc.

Preceded by Eugenio L. López III	ABS-CBN Corporation President; May 26, 1997 – December 31, 2003	Succeeded by Luis F. Alejandro
