= Pilipinas Got Talent season 4 =

Pilipinas Got Talent
- Season 4
- Hosted by: Billy Crawford; Luis Manzano
- Judges: Kris Aquino; Ai-Ai delas Alas; Freddie Garcia; Vice Ganda (Guest judge)
- Winner: Roel Manlangit
- Runner-up: Frankendal Fabroa
- Finals venue: PAGCOR Grand Theater
- No. of episodes: 33

Release
- Original network: ABS-CBN
- Original release: February 16 – June 8, 2013

Season chronology
- ← Previous; Season 3 Next → Season 5

The fourth season of Pilipinas Got Talent premiered on ABS-CBN from February 16 to June 8, 2013, replacing Sarah G. Live and was replaced by the first season of The Voice of the Philippines.

Billy Crawford and Luis Manzano returned as hosts for the season, joined once again by Freddie M. Garcia, Kris Aquino, and Ai-Ai delas Alas as the jury. Comedian Vice Ganda made a guest appearance as a judge during the 5th quarterfinals week and was later added as a permanent panelist in the following season.

Judges and host of Pilipinas Got Talent season 4

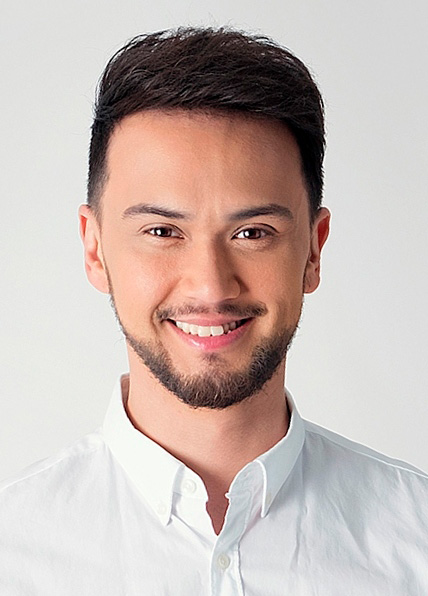
Billy Crawford (host)

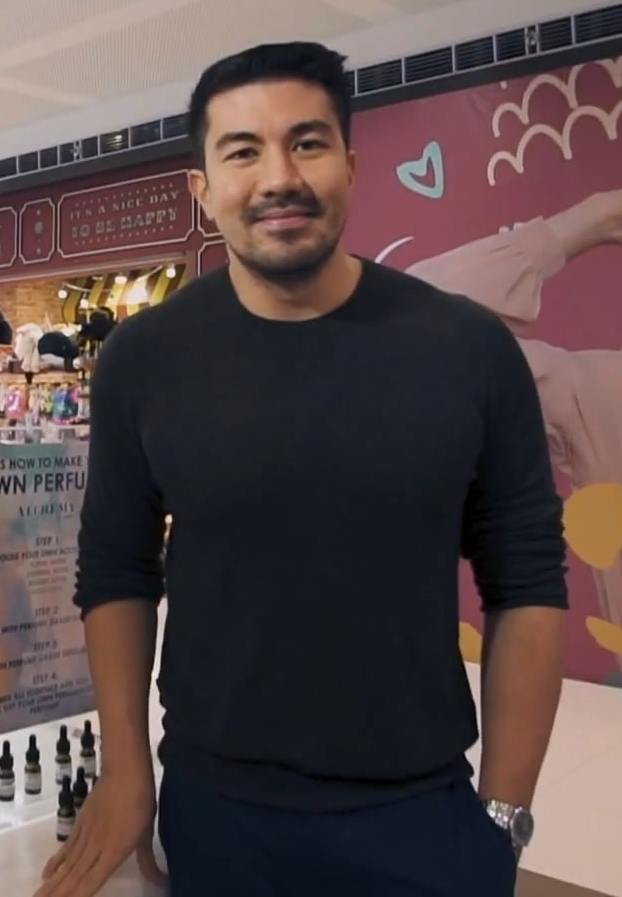
Luis Manzano (host)

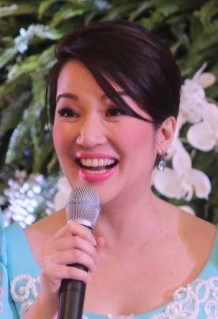
Kris Aquino

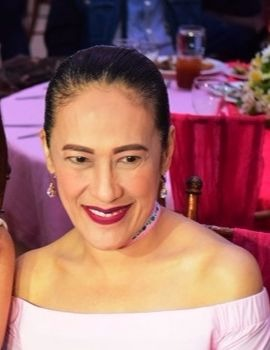
Ai-Ai de las Alas

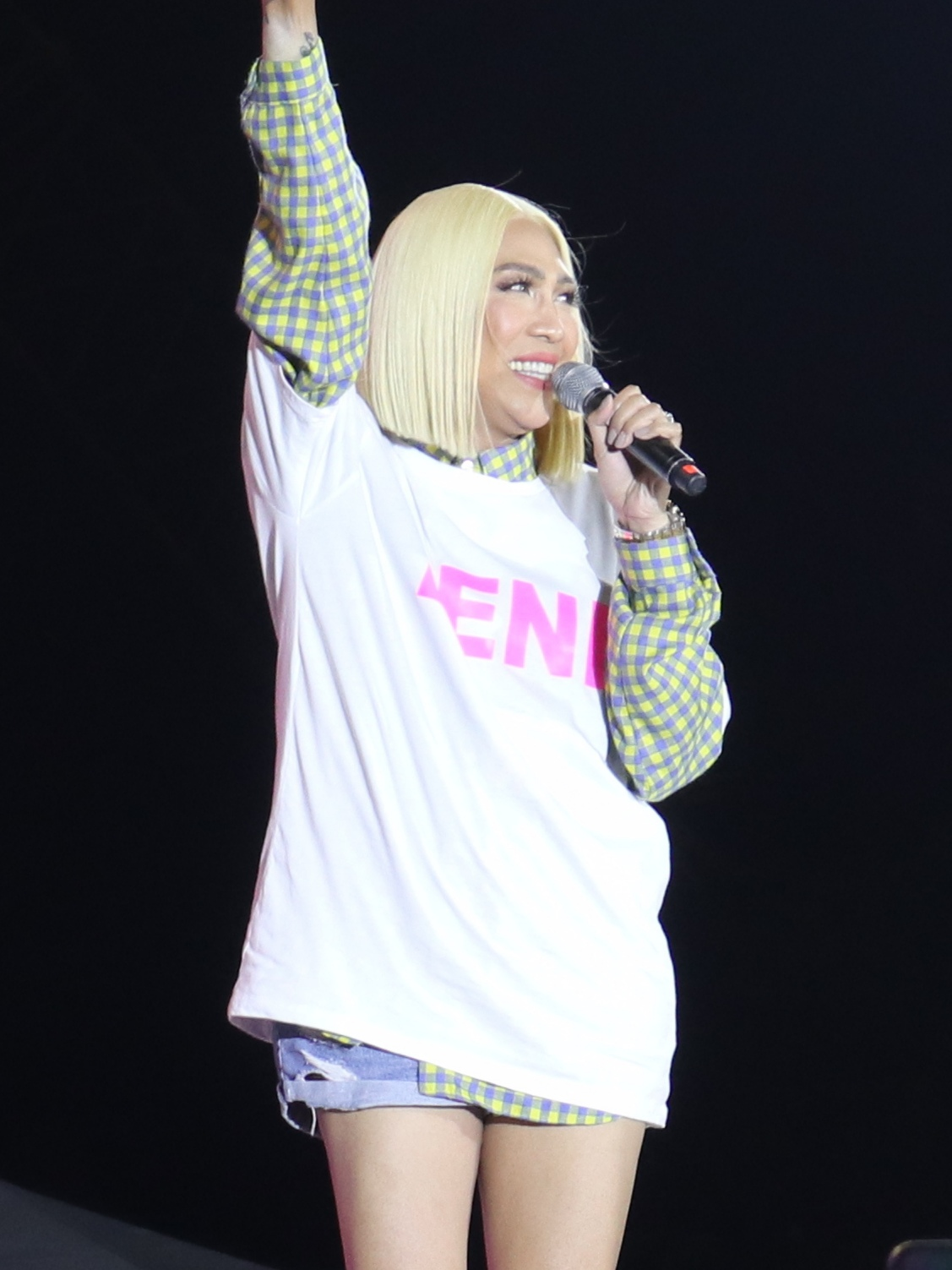
Vice Ganda (guest judge)

This season introduced a new round, the quarterfinals, which preceded the semi-finals. Contestants selected during the Judges' Cull competed for 12 semi-final slots, which were then narrowed down to six grand finalists.

Thirteen-year-old singer Roel Manlangit from Valencia, Bukidnon, was crowned the season's winner. Cyr wheel dancer Frankendal Fabroa, 29, from Tondo, Manila, was named the runner-up, while the acoustic musician duo MP3 Band from Davao City finished in third place. This marked the fourth consecutive season where a singer emerged as the winner.

A special episode, dubbed as You Got It! Kwento Natin 'To!, highlighting the past episodes of the season, was aired on June 8, 2013.

== Auditions ==
Cities where the major auditions were held.

A teaser for the fourth season were aired after the results night of The X Factor Philippines on July 29, 2012. Calls for auditions were announced in early August 2012. Major auditions were held in key cities like Parañaque, Quezon City, Dagupan, Bacolod, General Santos, Cebu and Davao City. Mini-auditions were also held in Manila, Marikina, Valenzuela City, Nueva Ecija, Olongapo, Taytay, Dasmariñas, Rosario, Santa Rosa City, San Pablo City, Batangas City, Lipa City, Lucena City, Gumaca, Calapan, Palawan, Iloilo, Consolacion, Dumaguete, Tacloban and Cagayan de Oro.

People were also able to audition online by uploading their audition videos to CgeTV, a user-generated video channel created by ABS-CBN Interactive. Online auditions ran from August 2012 until December 30, 2012. In addition, there are outdoor auditions for some acts in the show such as exhibitions, stunts and gymnastics that required materials like cars, motorcycles or swimming pool which held outside the venue.

Winners of TFCkat, an international competition made by The Filipino Channel which is held in Filipino key areas all over the world, were also given auditions slots.

Audition Date	City	Audition Venue
August 19, 2012	Quezon City	Trinity University of Asia
August 22 & 23, 2012	Bacolod	Bacolod Pavilion Resort Hotel
August 28 & 29, 2012	General Santos	Holy Trinity College of General Santos City
September 17 & 18, 2012	Cebu City	SM City Cebu
December 1 & 2, 2012	Cebu City	Cebu Institute of Technology – University
December 3 & 4, 2012	Davao City	Philippine Women's University – Davao
December 11 & 12, 2012	Naga, Camarines Sur	Camarines Sur Polytechnic Colleges
December 15 & 16, 2012	Dagupan	Lyceum Northwestern University
December 18 & 19, 2012	Quezon City	ABS-CBN
January 16, 17 & 18, 2013	Parañaque	PAGCOR Grand Theater

=== Successful auditionees ===
At the end of the auditions, all the artists who made it through the auditions will proceed to the "Judges Cull".

Successful auditionees of the fourth season of Pilipinas Got Talent
Auditionees from Luzon: Tahanang Walang Hagdan Wheelchair Dancesport and BMG Dancers, 18 - 36 — Wheelchair dancesport group, Cainta, Rizal; Frankendall Fabroa, 29 — Cyr wheel dancer, Manila; The Miss Tres, 30 - 32 — Singing transgender trio, Quezon City; Randy Da Silva, 20 — Singer, Olongapo City; Symmetry — Synchronized dance crew, Manila; Sinag Color Guards, 15 - 28 — Flag twirling group, Pasig; Philippine Gymnastics and Athletics Academy — Gymnastics group, Manila; Lateral Drift Production Team, 21 - 35 — Car drifting act, Manila; Oklahomoms, 37 - 63 — Dance group, Taguig City; Rolando Selfaison, 31 — Shadow animation artist; Marvin Orquero, 32 — Magician; Juancho Lunaria, 44 — Ventriloquist, Antipolo, Rizal; Aloha Fiesta, 20 - 25 — Hula dancing group; Jhun Penaso, 47 — Singer, Tanauan City, Batangas; Julian "IanKoy" Abrio, 20 — Illusionist, Makati; Ferdinand Abcede, 32 — Illusionist; Michael Fernando, 28 — Magician, Manila; Enriqueta Reyes, 62 — Balancer, Cainta, Rizal; Danilo Castillo, 49 — Singer, Manila; Ronnie Llave, 41 — Dancer, Lipa City, Batangas; D' Intensity Breakers, 14 — 28 — Dance crew, Lipa City, Batangas; Florendo Macalma, 63 — Dog tricks act, Quezon City; Kevin Bryan Bautista, 12 — Magician, Manila; Daughters 5 — Band, Manila; Zilent Overload, 23 - 30 — Blacklight dance crew, Manila; All n' One Crew, 10-34 — Light dancers, Cavite and Laguna; Security and Escort Battalion Combo Philippine Army, 24 - 37 — Musical band, Taguig; Richard Caballero, 23 — Pole dancer, Quezon City; The Fluma Viron of Cuerdas, 14 - 18 — Violin ensemble, Bulacan; Aerialist Brothers, 23 & 36 — Aerial acrobatics duo, Manila; Crewckattz Dancers, 13 - 28 — Puppet dancers, Isabela; The Can Can Group of Regidor Elementary School, 6 - 20 — Can-Can dance troupe, Manila; Eumee Lyn Capile, 23 — Singer, Valenzuela City; Abe Velasco, 27 — Cyclist, Manila; Bughaw Folkloric Dance Troupe, 16 - 36 — Cultural dance troupe, Mendez, Cavite; Balungao Robotic Dancers, 12 - 17 — Robotic dance crew, Pangasinan; All Star Kids, 10 - 15 — Dance crew, Bulacan; Rosenrei Synchro Sirens, 11 - 22 — Synchronized swimmers, Manila	Auditionees from Visayas: Dumaguete Duo, 29 & 38 — Singing duo, Dumaguete; Mark Glenn Segovia, 7 — Magician, Bacolod; Vertigo, 16 - 17 — Wall climbing dance duo, Cebu; Joel Bagguer Villaluz Sr., 70 — Keyboardist, Bacolod; John Neil Roa, 12 — Singer, Cebu; Fiesta Show Acrobats, 8 - 34 — Acrobatics group, Cordova, Cebu; G-Code, 19 - 21 — Singing group, Cebu City; Lumina, 15 - 20 — Aerial acrobatics trio, San Carlos City, Negros Occidental; Fiesta Broadway, 22 - 29 — Theatrical dance group, Cordova, Cebu; Break A Leg, 19 - 23 — Breakdancing crew, Roxas City, Capiz; VMA Cultural Arts, 18 - 24 — Dance troupe, Bacolod; West Crew, 17 - 19 — Tribal dance troupe, Iloilo City; Chaeremon Basa, 15 — Flair tricks act, Bacolod; Fiesta Fire Dancers — Fire dancing troupe, Cebu; Segutier Triplets, 12 — Martial arts trio, Iloilo; B.I.S. (Bacolod Inline Skates) — Skating dance crew, Bacolod; Jerald Abrigo, 25 — Fire dancer, Negros Occidental; Sundae Vinas, 28 — Sword balancer & belly dancer, Cebu; Bacolod Superstars, 21 & 29 — Ballroom dancing duo, Bacolod; Polaris, 13 - 17 — Pole dancing trio, Negros Occidental; MP3 Band, 22 - 24 — Acoustic trio, Manila
Auditionees from Mindanao: RMMC Dance + Site Project, 24 & 28 — Contemporary dancing duo, General Santos; EYX Point, 20 - 29 — Acrobatics trio, Surigao; Gensan Stunt Team, 22 & 36 — Stunt motorcyclists, General Santos; Alberto Dagohoy, 32 — Fire eating act, Cotabato; Marlou Jeffrey Diego, 20 — Isolation dancer, Polomolok, South Cotabato; Unod and Bukog, 24&30 — Balancing duo, Bukidnon; Davao Unicycle Club, 7 - 15 — Unicyclists, Davao; Richard Valencia, 20 — Singer, Koronadal, South Cotabato; Lunao Movers, 16 - 25 — Dance crew, Misamis Oriental; Alta Dance Ensemble, 17 - 22 — Dance crew and illusionists, Davao City; Ruel Flores, 31 — Opera singer, Zamboanga City; Roel Manlangit, 13 — Singer, Valencia, Bukidnon
Auditionees from the overseas: Joy Carbonell, 26 — Singer, Hong Kong (originally from Nueva Ecija); Cris Castro, 54 — Mask change artist, Hong Kong (originally from Manila); Remar Keni Ripo, 18 — Dancer, Japan; Cris Bernardo, 28 — Singer, Dubai, United Arab Emirates (originally from Calamba, Laguna); Maverick Gomez, 19 — Dancer, Spain; Gail Belmonte, 17 - Singer, Singapore; Russell Figueroa, 28 - Singer, Canada
NOTE: Please be guided that the list above is incomplete.

== Judges Cull ==
After the auditions, 104 acts made it to the Judges Cull held at the ABS-CBN Broadcasting Center in Quezon City. In this round, the judges will make a review of their auditions in order to choose the top 36 acts to compete in the Live Quarterfinals. The quarter finalists are composed of fourteen dance acts; seven singing acts; three musical acts; and twelve variety/novelty acts that include various stunts, outdoor acts, magic acts, acrobatics and gymnastics.

=== Top 36 results summary ===
Color Key

- Winner
- Runner-up
- Finalist
- Semi-finalist (lost judges' vote)
- Quarter-finalist (lost judges' vote)

Name of act	Age(s)	Genre	Act	Hometown	Quarterfinal Week	Semifinal Week	Result
Roel Manlangit	13	Singing	Singer	Valencia City, Bukidnon	5	7	Winner
Frankendal Fabroa	29	Dancing	Cyr wheel dancer	Tondo, Manila	5	8	Runner-up
MP3 Band	22 - 24	Music	Acoustic musicians	Davao City	3	7	Third place
Zilent Overload	12 - 20	Blacklight theater	Blacklight performers	Pasig	2	7	Fourth place
D' Intensity Breakers	14 - 28	Dancing	Dance crew	Lipa City	4	8	Fifth place
Lateral Drift Productions	22 - 36	Exhibition	Car drifters	Parañaque	6	8	Sixth place
Bughaw Folkloric Dance Group	16 - 36	Dancing	Cultural dance troupe	Mendez, Cavite	6	8	Eliminated
Eumee Lyn Capile	23	Singing	Singer	Valenzuela City	2	8	Eliminated
The Miss Tres	30 - 32	Singing	Singing trio	Marilao, Bulacan	1	8	Eliminated
Chaeremon Basa	15	Variety	Flair bartender	Bacolod	1	7	Eliminated
Symmetry	15 - 23	Dancing	Twin dancing	Davao City	3	7	Eliminated
Tito Cris Castro	54	Magic	Quick change artist	Sampaloc, Manila	4	7	Eliminated
VMA Cultural Arts	18 - 24	Dancing	Contemporary dance troupe	Bacolod	6	—N/a	Eliminated
Balungao Robotic Dancers	12 - 17	Dancing	Dance crew	Balungao, Pangasinan	6	—N/a	Eliminated
GenSan Stunt Team	24 & 36	Stunts	Stunt motorcyclists	General Santos	6	—N/a	Eliminated
Rosenrei Synchro Sirens	11 - 22	Gymnastics	Synchronized swimmers	Manila	6	—N/a	Eliminated
Cris Bernardo	28	Singing	Singer	Dubai, United Arab Emirates	5	—N/a	Eliminated
Crewckattz	14 - 27	Dancing	Puppet illusion dance crew	Isabela	5	—N/a	Eliminated
Philippine Gymnastics and Athletics Academy	Various	Gymnastics	Gymnastics group	Muntinlupa	5	—N/a	Eliminated
RMMC Dance + Site Project	24 & 28	Dancing	Contemporary dance duo	General Santos	5	—N/a	Eliminated
Russell Figueroa	28	Singing	Singer	Vancouver, Canada	4	—N/a	Eliminated
Lumina	15 - 20	Acrobatics	Aerial acrobatics trio	San Carlos City, Negros Occidental	4	—N/a	Eliminated
The Can Can Group of Regidor Elementary School	6 - 20	Dancing	Can-Can dance troupe	Santa Cruz, Manila	4	—N/a	Eliminated
The Fluma Viron of Cuerdas	14 - 18	Music	Violin ensemble	Baliuag, Bulacan	4	—N/a	Eliminated
Randy de Silva	20	Singing	Singer	Olongapo City	3	—N/a	Eliminated
Florendo "Randy" Macalma Jr.	63	Animal tricks	Dog tricks act	Quezon City	3	—N/a	Eliminated
Michael "Mifer" Fernando	34	Magic	Magician	Las Piñas	3	—N/a	Eliminated
Tahanang Walang Hagdan Wheelchair Dancesport and BMG Dancers	18 - 36	Dancing	Wheelchair dancesport group	Cainta, Rizal	3	—N/a	Eliminated
John Neil Roa	12	Singing	Singer	Cebu City	2	—N/a	Eliminated
EYX Point	20 - 28	Acrobatics	Acrobatics trio	Caloocan	2	—N/a	Eliminated
Sinag Color Guards (SI.CO.GU.)	14 - 28	Variety	Flag twirling group	Pasig	2	—N/a	Eliminated
Sundee Viñas	28	Dancing	Sword balancer / Belly dancer	Taal, Batangas	2	—N/a	Eliminated
Security and Escort Battalion Combo Philippine Army	24 - 38	Music	Musical ensemble	Taguig City	1	—N/a	Eliminated
All In One Crew	10 - 18	Dancing	Blacklight dance crew	General Trias	1	—N/a	Eliminated
Marvin Arquero	32	Magic	Magician	Malolos, Bulacan	1	—N/a	Eliminated
Segutier Triplets	12	Martial arts	Martial arts trio	Iloilo	1	—N/a	Eliminated

== Quarterfinals ==
The Quarterfinals began on April 6, 2013, in PAGCOR Grand Theater in Parañaque, Metro Manila. Each week, performances from six acts took place on Saturday nights, while the results are announced during Sunday nights of which two acts — one act chosen through public poll via SMS votes and one chosen by the judges — will proceed to the semifinals. Oftentimes during results nights, guests are invited live to perform.

=== Quarterfinals summary ===
Color Key

- Won the public vote
- Won the judges' vote
- Lost the judges' vote
- Buzzed out
- Judge's vote

==== Week 1 (April 6 & 7) ====
- Guest performers: Yeng Constantino and Angeline Quinto. Angel Calalas, Freestylers, Rico the Magician, and Happy Feet from PGT season 2

Contestant	Order	Act	Buzzes and judges' votes			Percentage	Result
Contestant	Order	Act	FMG	Kris	Ai-ai	Percentage	Result
The Miss Tres	1	Singing trio				15.88%	Advanced
Chaeremon Basa	2	Flair bartender				28.09%	Advanced
All In One Crew	3	Blacklight dance crew				10.88%	Eliminated
Security and Escort Battalion Combo Philippine Army	4	Musical ensemble				24.61%	Eliminated
Segutier Triplets	5	Martial arts trio				11.40%	Eliminated
Marvin Arquero	6	Magician				9.14%	Eliminated

==== Week 2 (April 13 & 14) ====
- Guest performers: Gloc-9, Zia Quizon, Abra, Paolo Valenciano, Filogram and B4 from season 2, and Kiriko from season 3

Contestant	Order	Act	Buzzes and judges' votes			Percentage	Result
Contestant	Order	Act	FMG	Kris	Ai-ai	Percentage	Result
SI.CO.GU.	1	Flag twirling group				3.03%	Eliminated
John Neil Roa	2	Singer				22.45%	Eliminated
Sundee Viñas	3	Sword balancer / Belly dancer				10.32%	Eliminated
EYX Point	4	Acrobatics trio				7.06%	Eliminated
Eumee Lyn Capile	5	Singer				16.49%	Advanced
Zilent Overload	6	Blacklight performers				40.65%	Advanced

==== Week 3 (April 20 & 21) ====
- Guest performers: Iya Villania and Nikki Gil. Ryan Christian Recto made a special birthday tribute to his eldest brother, Luis Manzano, together with Villania and Gil along with Manzano's other non-celebrity friends, Dance Selection from season 2, and Wushu Discovery from season 3

Contestant	Order	Act	Buzzes and judges' votes			Percentage	Result
Contestant	Order	Act	FMG	Kris	Ai-ai	Percentage	Result
Tahanang Walang Hagdan Wheelchair Dancesport and BMG Dancers	1	Wheelchair dancesport group				12.28%	Eliminated
Florendo "Randy" Macalma Jr.	2	Dog tricks act				6.94%	Eliminated
MP3 Band	3	Acoustic musicians				43.65%	Advanced
Symmetry	4	Dance crew				15.71%	Advanced
Randy de Silva	5	Singer				16.97%	Eliminated
Michael "Mifer" Fernando	6	Magician				4.45%	Eliminated

==== Week 4 (April 27 & 28) ====
- Guest performers: KZ Tandingan and Jed Madela. Maria Jeline Oliva and Keith Clark Delleva from season 1, and Buildex Pagales from season 2

Contestant	Order	Act	Buzzes and judges' votes			Percentage	Result
Contestant	Order	Act	FMG	Kris	Ai-ai	Percentage	Result
The Can Can Group of Regidor Elementary School	1	Can-Can dance troupe				12.19%	Eliminated
Tito Cris Castro	2	Quick change artist				24.62%	Advanced
Russell Figueroa	3	Singer				15.09%	Eliminated
Lumina	4	Aerial acrobatics trio				6.96%	Eliminated
The Fluma Viron of Cuerdas	5	Violin ensemble				4.41%	Eliminated
D' Intensity Breakers	6	Dance crew				36.72%	Advanced

==== Week 5 (May 4 & 5) ====
Ai-Ai delas Alas was not able to attend the fifth week of quarterfinals due to illness. Due to this, Vice Ganda was asked to take her duties, but only as a replacement judge for the week.

- Guest performers: Vice Ganda, NielBeth (Leoniel Enopia and Elizabeth Dazo) from season 2, and Twin Divas from season 3

Contestant	Order	Act	Buzzes and judges' votes			Percentage	Result
Contestant	Order	Act	FMG	Kris	Vice	Percentage	Result
Cris Bernardo	1	Singer				24.30%	Eliminated
Crewckattz	2	Puppet illusionists / Dance crew				5.54%	Eliminated
Frankendal Fabroa	3	Cyr wheel dancer				17.97%	Advanced
Philippine Gymnastics and Athletics Academy	4	Gymnastics group				5.78%	Eliminated
Roel Manlangit	5	Singer				37.53%	Advanced
RMMC Dance + Site Project	6	Contemporary dance duo				8.88%	Eliminated

==== Week 6 (May 11 & 12) ====
- Guest performer: Bamboo Mañalac

Contestant	Order	Act^{1}	Buzzes and judges' votes			Percentage	Result
Contestant	Order	Act^{1}	FMG	Kris	Ai-ai	Percentage	Result
Rosenrei Synchro Sirens	1	Synchronized swimmers				12.19%	Eliminated
VMA Cultural Arts	2	Contemporary dance troupe				15.09%	Eliminated
Balungao Robotic Dancers	3	Dance crew				6.96%	Eliminated
Bughaw Folkloric Dance Group	4	Cultural dance troupe				36.72%	Advanced
GenSan Stunt Team	5	Stunt motorcyclists				4.41%	Eliminated
Lateral Drift Productions	6	Car drifters				24.62%	Advanced

1. The performances of the six remaining acts were held outside of PAGCOR Theater as a bigger space was needed for them to perform.

== Semifinals ==
The Semifinals began on May 18, 2013, in PAGCOR Grand Theater in Parañaque, Metro Manila. For two weeks, six quarterfinalist winners per week will perform for a special spot in the six slots for the finals. The mechanics for the semifinals will be the same from the quarterfinals. However, three acts will be chosen per week, instead of the usual two — one act coming from the public's vote, and two from the judges' votes.

Also just like the quarterfinals, guests will be invited to perform in the show.

=== Semifinals summary ===
Color key

- Won the public vote
- Won the judges' vote
- Lost the judges' vote
- Buzzed out
- Judge's vote

==== Week 7 (May 18 & 19) ====
- Guest performers: Nikki Gil, Bugoy Cariño (recorded performance), Sam Concepcion, Eric Tai, Kris Lawrence

Contestant	Order	Act	Buzzes and judges' votes			Percentage	Result
Contestant	Order	Act	FMG	Kris	Ai-ai	Percentage	Result
Chaeremon Basa	1	Flair bartender				19.50%	Eliminated
Tito Cris Castro	2	Quick change artist				12.33%	Eliminated
MP3 Band	3	Acoustic musicians				25.69%	Advanced
Symmetry	4	Dance crew				4.66%	Eliminated
Roel Manlangit	5	Singer				20.28%	Advanced
Zilent Overload	6	Blacklight performers				17.05%	Advanced

==== Week 8 (May 25 & 26) ====
Contestant	Order	Act	Buzzes and judges' votes			Percentage	Result
Contestant	Order	Act	FMG	Kris	Ai-ai	Percentage	Result
The Miss Tres	1	Singing trio				7.94%	Eliminated
Bughaw Folkloric Dance Group	2	Cultural dance troupe				23.29%	Eliminated
Eumee Lyn Capile	3	Singer				9.36%	Eliminated
Frankendal Fabroa	4	Cyr wheel dancer				20.15%	Advanced
Lateral Drift Productions^{1}	5	Car drifters				9.63%	Advanced
D' Intensity Breakers	6	Dance crew				29.63%	Advanced

1. The performance of Lateral Drift Productions was held outside of PAGCOR Theater as a bigger space was needed for them to perform.

== Grand Finals ==
The Grand Finals was held on June 1–2, 2013 in PAGCOR Grand Theater in Parañaque, Metro Manila.

The performance of Lateral Drift Productions was held outside of PAGCOR Theater as a bigger space was needed for them to perform.

- Guest performers:

June 1, 2013
- Special performers: El Gamma Penumbra of season 3 performed a shadow theater routine based on Francis Magalona's "Tayo'y Mga Pinoy"

June 2, 2013
- Celebrity performers: Ai-Ai delas Alas, Jhong Hilario, Streetboys, Zia Quizon, KZ Tandingan, Zsa Zsa Padilla
- Special performers: Seasons 1 to 3 winners Jovit Baldivino, Marcelito Pomoy, Maasinhon Trio

Color key

- Winner
- Runner-up
- Third place

Contestant	Order	Act	Buzzes			Percentage	Result
Contestant	Order	Act	FMG	Kris	Ai-ai	Percentage	Result
Roel Manlangit	1	Singer				30.22%	1st
D' Intensity Breakers	2	Dance crew				11.87%	5th
Frankendal Fabroa	3	Cyr wheel dancer				28.07%	2nd
Lateral Drift Productions	4	Car drifters				2.44%	6th
MP3 Band	5	Acoustic band				17.48%	3rd
Zilent Overload	6	Black light performers				11.91%	4th

== Criticism ==
With Roel Manlangit declared as the winner of the fourth season, many Filipino netizens were disappointed with the show for its preference with singers. The show had produced six singers (Baldivino, Pomoy, Maasinhon Trio, and Manlangit himself) for four straight seasons, all of whom were males. Many had vented their disappointments on Twitter. One shared that in order to win the show, one must be a male singer with a very sad and tragic background story. Some netizens also recommended to change the title of the show to "Pilipinas Got Singers," pertaining much to the winning streak of singers in the show.

== Television ratings ==
Television ratings for the fourth season of Pilipinas Got Talent on ABS-CBN are gathered from two major sources, namely from AGB Nielsen and Kantar Media. AGB Nielsen's survey ratings are gathered from Mega Manila households, while Kantar Media's survey ratings are gathered from all over the Philippines' urban and rural households.

Stage	Week	Air Date	Television ratings from AGB Nielsen			Television ratings from Kantar Media			Source
Stage	Week	Air Date	Rating	Ranking		Rating	Ranking		Source
Stage	Week	Air Date	Rating	Timeslot	Primetime	Rating	Timeslot	Primetime	Source
Auditions	1	February 16	23.0%	#1	#2	29.6%	#1	#3	
Auditions	1	February 17	18.4%	#2	#4	25.8%	#1	#1	
Auditions	2	February 23	22.5%	#2	#3	30.1%	#1	#3	
Auditions	2	February 24	18.6%	#2	#5	28.0%	#1	#1	
Auditions	3	March 2	22.6%	#2	#3	27.5%	#1	#3	
Auditions	3	March 3	20.2%	#1	#3	25.4%	#1	#1	
Auditions	4	March 9	22.9%	#1	#3	29.5%	#1	#2	
Auditions	4	March 10	22.7%	#1	#3	29.4%	#1	#1	
Auditions	5	March 16	23.7%	#1	#2	28.4%	#1	#2	
Auditions	5	March 17	22.6%	#1	#2	22.7%	#1	#2	
Auditions	6	March 23	20.4%	#1	#3	27.4%	#1	#3	
Judges' Cull	6	March 24	20.5%	#1	#4	27.7%	#1	#1	
Judges' Cull	7	March 31	16.4%	#2	#5	20.1%	#1	#2	
Quarterfinals	8	April 6	19.3%	#2	#3	26.3%	#1	#3	
Quarterfinals	8	April 7	13.7%	#2	#5	23.7%	#1	#1	
Quarterfinals	9	April 13	18.6%	#2	#4	24.4%	#1	#3	
Quarterfinals	9	April 14	13.6%	#2	#7	22.2%	#1	#1	
Quarterfinals	10	April 20	18.3%	#2	#3	24.0%	#1	#3	
Quarterfinals	10	April 21	15.2%	#1	#5	23.0%	#1	#1	
Quarterfinals	11	April 27	19.1%	#1	#4	22.3%	#1	#4	
Quarterfinals	11	April 28	14.2%	#2	#5	23.2%	#1	#1	
Quarterfinals	12	May 4	19.2%	#2	#5	23.7%	#1	#3	
Quarterfinals	12	May 5	18.7%	#2	#3	24.5%	#1	#1	
Quarterfinals	13	May 11	19.1%	#2	#5	21.9%	#1	#4	
Quarterfinals	13	May 12	15.0%	#3	#4	21.2%	#1	#1	
Semifinals	14	May 18	18.4%	#2	#5	21.7%	#1	#3	
Semifinals	14	May 19	15.2%	#3	#7	24.1%	#1	#1	
Semifinals	15	May 25	19.8%	#2	#5	23.9%	#1	#3	
Semifinals	15	May 26	18.9%	#2	#4	24.9%	#2	#2	
Finals	16	June 1	24.5%	#1	#1	30.6%	#1	#2	
Finals	16	June 2	24.5%	#1	#1	30.2%	#1	#1	
You Got It! Kwento Natin 'To!	—	June 8	19.0%	#2	#5	21.3%	#1	#3	
Season Average			19.34%	#2	#4	25.27%	#1	#2	

Color keys
Highest rating during the season
Lowest rating during the season
