= Pilipinas Got Talent season 3 =

Pilipinas Got Talent
- Season 3
- Hosted by: Billy Crawford; Luis Manzano
- Judges: Freddie M. Garcia; Kris Aquino; Ai-Ai de las Alas
- Winner: Maasinhon Trio
- Runner-up: Khalil Joseph Ramos
- No. of episodes: 32

Release
- Original network: ABS-CBN
- Original release: July 9 – October 23, 2011

Season chronology
- ← Previous; Season 2 Next → Season 4

The third season of Pilipinas Got Talent aired on ABS-CBN from July 9 to October 23, 2011, and was replaced by Pinoy Big Brother: Unlimited.

The season premiered just two weeks after the previous one concluded, with both seasons produced back-to-back. Billy Crawford and Luis Manzano continued their hosting roles, while Freddie M. Garcia, Kris Aquino, and Ai-Ai delas Alas returned as jury members.

Judges and host of Pilipinas Got Talent season 3

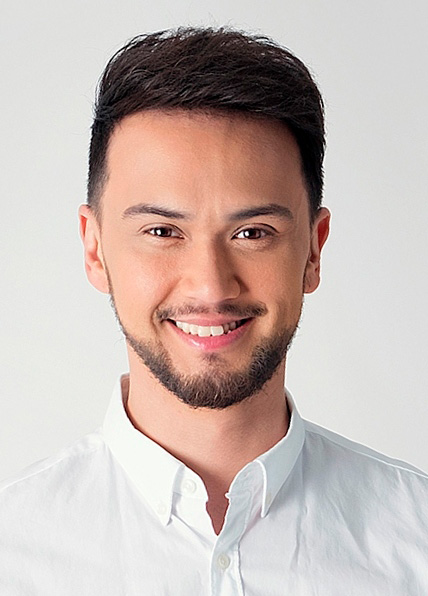
Billy Crawford (host)

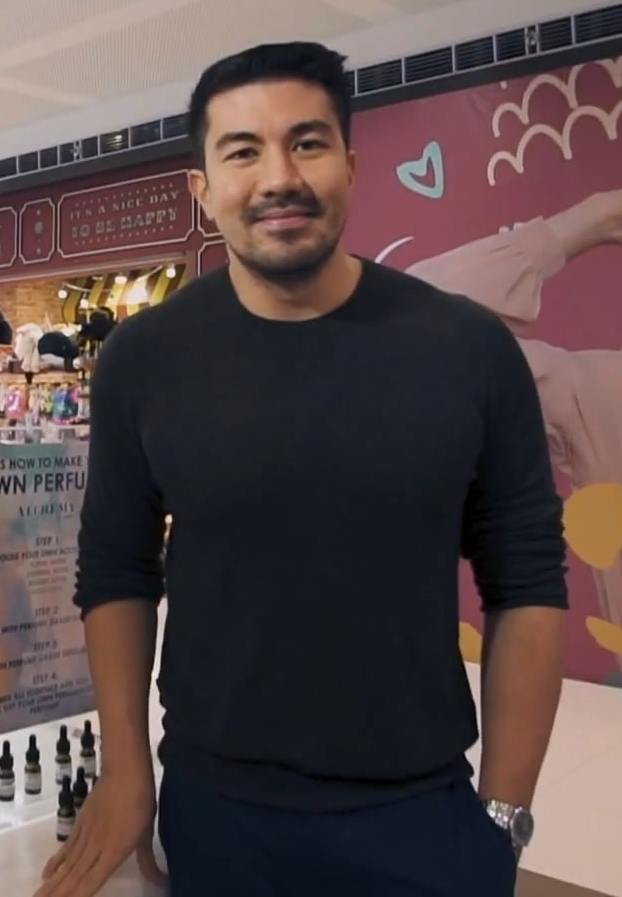
Luis Manzano (host)

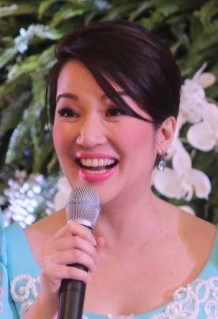
Kris Aquino

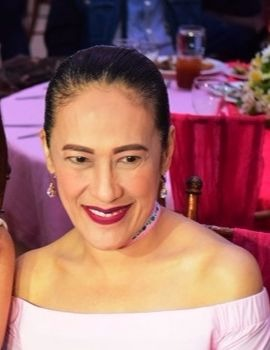
Ai-Ai de las Alas

The singing trio Maasinhon Trio from Southern Leyte emerged as the season's winner, followed by 15-year-old singer Khalil Ramos from Parañaque as the runner-up, and the acoustic duo Bringas Brothers securing third place. This marked the third consecutive season where a singer emerged as the winner.

== Auditions ==
Cities where the major auditions were held.

The auditions for the third season took place in key cities in the Philippines. Major auditions were held in Baguio, Manila, Batangas, Cebu, Bacolod, Tacloban, Iloilo, Cagayan de Oro, Davao, and General Santos.

There were also mini-auditions in several cities and provinces in the Philippines including Laoag, Vigan, Tuguegarao, Apayao, Isabela, Baguio, Pangasinan, Cabanatuan, Tarlac, Baler, Manila, Laguna, San Pablo City, Lucena, Camarines Norte, Camarines Sur, Catanduanes, Albay, Sorsogon, Masbate, Mindoro, Puerto Princesa, Kalibo, Roxas City, Catarman, Catbalogan, Borongan, Ormoc, Dumaguete, Bohol, Camiguin, Iligan, Butuan, Bukidnon, Dipolog, Zamboanga, Kidapawan, Marbel, Digos and Mati. These mini-auditions are judged by Pilipinas Got Talent staff and those who passed will make it to the regional auditions.

In addition, online auditions was put up where contestants can upload their own audition video and send it to the website of Pilipinas Got Talent.

The show picked the best act "The One" every airing night to receive P5,000 sponsored by Head & Shoulders. Loverkada Kids became the first recipient of the award.

Date of Audition	Audition Venue	City
April 26 & 27, 2011	Cebu Institute of Technology – University	Cebu City, Cebu
April 26 & 27, 2011	La Consolacion College – Bacolod	Bacolod, Negros Occidental
April 29 & 30, 2011	Leyte Normal University	Tacloban, Leyte
April 29 & 30, 2011	Iloilo National High School	Iloilo City, Iloilo
May 4 & 5, 2011	Capitol University	Cagayan de Oro, Misamis Oriental
May 7 & 8, 2011	The Philippine Women's College of Davao	Davao City, Davao del Sur
May 7 & 8, 2011	ABS - CBN Studio 9	Quezon City, Metro Manila
May 10 & 11, 2011	Lyceum of the Philippines University, Batangas	Batangas City, Batangas
May 10 & 11, 2011	Holy Trinity College of General Santos	General Santos, South Cotabato
May 25 & 26, 2011	SM Cinema 1, SM City Cebu	Cebu City, Cebu
June 8 & 9, 2011	Liceo de Cagayan University	Cagayan de Oro, Misamis Oriental
June 16 & 17, 2011	University of Baguio	Baguio, Benguet
June 23 & 24, 2011	PAGCOR Grand Theater	Parañaque, Metro Manila

== Successful auditionees ==
At the end of the auditions, a total 187 artists made it through the auditions and will proceed to the "Judges Cull".

Successful Auditionees

- Rene Roda, 30 - Singer, Negros Occidental
- Joseph Calicdan, 22 - Double Character Singer, Baguio
- Michelle Elaine Paredes, 16 - Acoustic Singer, Misamis Oriental
- Jefferson & Kurt Bringas - Acoustic Duo, Davao del Sur
- April Conlu, 36 - Singer, Bacolod
- Trio Aerialist - Aerial Fabric Dancers, Negros Occidental
- Blitz Box Crew - Dance Troupe, Nueva Ecija
- Larry Tamala, 57 - Comedian, Davao City
- Lucky Twins - Contemporary Dancing Duo, Tacloban
- Loverkada Kids - Gymnastics Group and Contortionists, Butuan
- Ronnie Daquila, 18 - Singer, General Santos
- Casiano Bucoy Jr., 47 - Singer, Zamboanga City
- Friendshipz - Singing and Acting Duo, Bacolod
- Upbeat Dance Company Kids, 9-14 - Ballet Dancing Troupe, Bukidnon
- Geo Ed Rebucas, 20 - Falsetto Singer, Zamboanga del Sur
- Flip Duo - Dancing Duo, Bukidnon
- Bahaghari - Reggae Band, Iloilo City
- Jeziel Dimagna-ong, 36 - Singer, Siquijor
- Jane Ann Arnado, 6 - Hula Hoop Tricker, Cebu City
- Efren Villanueva, 22 - Singer, Batangas City
- Inner Core - Band, Marilao, Bulacan
- Twin Divas - Singing and Belly Dancing Duo, Nueva Ecija
- Gay Dancers - Dancing Duo, Nueva Ecija
- Hello World - Dance Troupe, Davao City
- Jay-R Obedencia, 18 - Dancer / Comedian, Agusan del Sur
- Knch Lhnn Cabillo, 10 - Singer, Cebu City
- Triple Sensez - Poppin Dancing Trio, Cebu City
- Amazing Paper Dolls - Dance Troupe, Zambales
- Robert Miller, 25 - Singer & Dancer, Dumaguete
- Galileo Brocoy, 3 - Intellectual gifted child, Baler, Aurora
- Zailyn Galit, 20 - Singer, Northern Samar
- Twins Rock, 21 - Singing Duo, South Cotabato
- Sandugo Band - Reggae Band, San Pablo City, Laguna
- Vocal FX, 16-21 - Beatboxing Group, Bacolod
- Richelle Villamor, 17 - Singer, Masbate
- Ashley Campbell, 19 - Singer, Cebu
- Sendhara Trillanes, 12 - Singer and Keyboardist, Batangas
- Randy Gemabe, 35 - Singer
- Jemuel Ventunilla, 9 - Singer, Marikina
- Jive Dancers - Dance Troupe, Tacloban City
- Alas Onse - Band, Cebu City
- Synergy Dance Troupe - Aerial Acrobatics Dance Troupe, San Carlos City, Negros Occidental
- Jalene Thomas, 16 - Singer, Bacolod
- Kristoffer Campos, 22 - Saxophonist, Baguio
- Willy Cordovales, 40 - Singer, Antipolo
- El Gamma Penumbra - Shadow Theater Group, Batangas
- Jonathan Trogo, 33 - Wire Balancer and Singer, Iloilo
- Sulpicio Garcia, 33 - Musician and Singer, Marikina
- Dustin Mariano, 7 - Fire Dancer, Antipolo
- Ivan Richard Catubig, 7 - Magician, Antipolo
- Gino Alonzo, 23 - Magician, Davao City
- Joanne Lery Dagohoy, 18 - Singer, Antipolo
- Lou Angeline Ulanday, 18 - Singer, Bataan
- Lloyd Virgo, 29 - Opera Singer, Baguio
- Khalil Joseph Ramos, 15 - Singer, Parañaque
- Kim Tenorio, 35 - Puppetteer, Liliw, Laguna
- Leo Pabellan, 27 - Singer and Dancer, Las Piñas
- Juliet Thea Pitogo, 18 - Singer and Musician, Negros Occidental
- Miss D. Dance Scholars - Ballroom Dancing Troupe, Lucena City
- Lordcint Agbas, 6 - Singer, Negros Occidental
- Jesus Bobles II, 27 - Singer, Bacolod
- Cristo Cadiz, 39 - Singer, Lipa City
- Pauline Agupitan, 11 - Singer, Lipa City
- Allen Quezon, 35 - Singer, Iligan City
- Bruce Christian Osorio, 18 - Singer, Davao City
- Edmond Gaduang, 17 - Keyboardist, Nueva Ecija
- Wushu Discovery - Martial Arts Troupe, Quezon City
- Blue Lime Band - Acoustic Band, Baguio
- Good Rhymes - Dance Troupe, Manila
- Jara Balido, 28 - Singer, San Pablo City
- Tribo Tambolero - Percussion Band, Sorsogon
- That's My Crew Contemporary Dancing Duo, Bulacan
- Technojazz - Cheerdancing Troupe, Manila
- Philippine Dubstep - Beatboxing Duo, General Santos & Davao City
- Charmuse - Singing Trio, General Santos
- Jampack - Singing Trio, Negros Occidental
- Maasinhon Trio - Singing Trio, Maasin, Southern Leyte
- J2911 - Dance Crew, Negros Occidental
- Allhyn Jay Canete, 19 - Aerial Fabric Dancer, Negros Occidental
- Seedz Band - Band, Escalante, Negros Occidental
- Vrenilyn Villaflor, 20 - Singer, Quezon City
- Campus - Singing Group, Manila
- Porcel Brothers - Singing Duo, Negros Occidental
- Marlon Custodio a.k.a. "Elok Palabok" - Voice Impressionist, Tanay, Rizal
- Rowell Quizon, 28 - Singer, Manila
- Lizette Kristel Llono, 18 - Singer, Laguna
- Jett Barrun, 22 - Singer, Pateros

NOTE: Please be guided that the list above is incomplete.

== Judges Cull ==
After the nationwide auditions (including online auditions), 187 acts made it to the next round called "The Judges Cull" where the judges were able to make a review of the contenders who passed the auditions which they are going to choose the top 36 semi-finalists. The Judges' Cull was held in ABS-CBN Studios in Quezon City where 24 acts from Luzon and Mindanao made it to the semi-finals. In addition, the 12 acts from Visayas were visited by the judges as well as Billy Crawford and Luis Manzano in their respective hometowns.

=== Top 36 results summary ===
Color key

- Winner
- Runner-up
- Finalist
- Semi-finalist (lost judges' vote)

Name of act	Age(s)	Genre	Act	Hometown	Semifinal Week	Result
Maasinhon Trio	40 – 45	Singing	Singing Trio	Southern Leyte	5	Winner
Khalil Joseph Ramos	15	Singing	Singer	Parañaque	6	Runner-up
Bringas Brothers	25 & 27	Singing	Acoustic Duo	Davao del Sur	3	Third place
El Gamma Penumbra	12 - 26	Shadow play	Shadow theater group	Batangas City	1	Fourth place
Synergy	14 – 19	Acrobatics	Aerial acrobatics troupe	San Carlos City, Negros Occidental	3	Fifth place
Sandugo Band	18 – 33	Music	Reggae band	San Pablo City, Laguna	2	Sixth place
Twin Divas	25	Singing and Dancing	Singing and Dancing Duo	Nueva Ecija	4	Seventh place
Renagine Pepito	11	Singing	Singer	Cagayan de Oro	5	Eighth place
Loverkada Kids	8 – 14	Gymnastics	Gymnastics Group and Contortionists	Butuan	4	Ninth place
Muriel Lomadilla	16	Singing	Singer	Lapu-Lapu City	2	Tenth place
Kiriko	20 – 31	Music	Rappers	Santa Cruz, Laguna	6	Eleventh place
Lucky Twins	21	Dancing	Contemporary Dancing Duo	Tacloban City	1	Twelfth place
Jet Barrun	22	Singing	Singer	Pateros	6	Semifinalist
Flip Duo	38 & 43	Comedy and Dancing	Comedic Dancing Duo	Bukidnon	6	Semifinalist
Jane Ann Arnado	6	Variety	Hula Hoop Tricker	San Remigio, Cebu	6	Semifinalist
Technojazz	14 – 19	Dancing	Cheerdancing Troupe	Sampaloc, Manila & General Santos	6	Semifinalist
Jeziel Dimagna-ong	38	Singing	Singer	Siquijor	5	Semifinalist
Negros Dance Superstars	18 – 27	Dancing	Ballroom Dancing Troupe	Negros Occidental	5	Semifinalist
Philippine Dubstep	19 & 20	Music	Beatboxing Duo	Davao City & General Santos	5	Semifinalist
Wushu Discovery	14 – 27	Martial arts	Martial Arts Troupe	Quezon City	5	Semifinalist
Rowell Quizon	28	Singing	Singer	Manila	4	Semifinalist
Inner Core	26 – 32	Music	Band	Marilao, Bulacan	4	Semifinalist
Kim Tenorio	38	Theater puppetry	Puppeteer	Liliw, Laguna	4	Semifinalist
Triple Senzes	20 – 23	Dancing	Dance crew	Cebu City	4	Semifinalist
Jive Dancers	14 – 20	Dancing	Dance crew	Leyte	3	Semifinalist
Gensan Contortionists	Various	Gymnastics	Contortionist Duo	General Santos	3	Semifinalist
Lyn del Rosario	44	Singing	Singer	Muntinlupa	3	Semifinalist
Rhonsben Jonota	12	Singing	Singer	Negros Occidental	3	Semifinalist
Geo Ed Rebucas	20	Singing	Falsetto Singer	Zamboanga del Sur	2	Semifinalist
Marvic Alvarez	8	Variety	Metal Balancer and Twirler	Biñan, Laguna	2	Semifinalist
Saurog Dance Troupe	18 – 20	Dancing	Ballroom Dance Troupe	Eastern Samar	2	Semifinalist
Willy Cordovales	40	Singing	Singer	Antipolo	2	Semifinalist
Seedz Band	22 – 29	Music	Band	Escalante, Negros Occidental	1	Semifinalist
Kristoffer Campos	22	Music	Saxophonist	Baguio	1	Semifinalist
Pauline Agupitan	11	Singing	Singer	Lipa City	1	Semifinalist
Rita Paraiso	39	Singing	Singer	Hong Kong/Tondo, Manila	1	Semifinalist

== Live shows ==
=== Semifinals ===
The Semifinals began on September 10, 2011, in PAGCOR Grand Theater in Parañaque, Metro Manila. Each week, performances from six acts took place on Saturday nights, while the results are announced during Sunday nights of which two acts will proceed to the grand finals. Often during results nights, guests are invited live to perform.

=== Semifinals summary ===
The order columns list the order of appearance each act made for every episode.

Color key

- Won the public vote
- Won the judges' vote
- Lost the judges' vote
- Buzzed out
- Judge's vote

==== Week 1 (September 10 & 11) ====
Contestant	Order	Act	Buzzes and judges' votes			Percentage	Result
Contestant	Order	Act	FMG	Kris	Ai-ai	Percentage	Result
Seedz Band	1	Band				13.00%	Eliminated
Pauline Agupitan	2	Singer				12.39%	Eliminated
Lucky Twins	3	Contemporary Dancing Duo				17.82%	Advanced
Kristoffer Campos	4	Saxophonist				8.42%	Eliminated
Rita Paraiso	5	Singer				10.98%	Eliminated
El Gamma Penumbra	6	Shadow Theater Group				37.38%	Advanced

==== Week 2 (September 17 & 18) ====
Contestant	Order	Act	Buzzes and judges' votes			Percentage	Result
Contestant	Order	Act	FMG	Kris	Ai-ai	Percentage	Result
Geo Ed Rebucas	1	Falsetto Singer				23.92%	Eliminated
Saurog Dance Company	2	Ballroom Dance Troupe				8.45%	Eliminated
Willy Cordovales	3	Singer				17.06%	Eliminated
Marvic Alvarez	4	Metal Balancer and Twirler				5.71%	Eliminated
Sandugo Band	5	Reggae Band				27.13%	Advanced
Muriel Lomadilla	6	Singer				17.06%	Advanced

==== Week 3 (September 24 & 25) ====
Contestant	Order	Act	Buzzes and judges' votes			Percentage	Result
Contestant	Order	Act	FMG	Kris	Ai-ai	Percentage	Result
Rhonsben Jonota	1	Singer				10.98%	Eliminated
Gensan Contortionists	2	Contortionist Duo				8.42%	Eliminated
Bringas Brothers	3	Acoustic Duo				37.38%	Advanced
Jive Dancers	4	Dance Crew				13.00%	Eliminated
Lyn del Rosario	5	Singer				12.39%	Eliminated
Synergy	6	Aerial Acrobatics Troupe				17.82%	Advanced

==== Week 4 (October 1 & 2) ====
Contestant	Order	Act	Buzzes and judges' votes			Percentage	Result
Contestant	Order	Act	FMG	Kris	Ai-ai	Percentage	Result
Twin Divas	1	Singing and Dancing Duo				28.30%	Advanced
Kim Tenorio	2	Puppeteer				5.84%	Eliminated
Rowell Quizon	3	Singer				17.10%	Eliminated
Triple Senzes	4	Popping Dance Crew				6.64%	Eliminated
Inner Core	5	Band				7.36%	Eliminated
Loverkada Kids	6	Gymnastics Group and Contortionists				34.78%	Advanced

==== Week 5 (October 8 & 9) ====
Contestant	Order	Act	Buzzes and judges' votes			Percentage	Result
Contestant	Order	Act	FMG	Kris	Ai-ai	Percentage	Result
Wushu Discovery	1	Martial Arts Troupe				1.19%	Eliminated
Jeziel Dimagna-ong	2	Singer				14.60%	Eliminated
Negros Dance Superstars	3	Ballroom Dancing Troupe				6.57%	Eliminated
Maasinhon Trio	4	Singing Trio				52.33%	Advanced
Philippine Dubstep	5	Beatboxing Duo				4.32%	Eliminated
Renagine Pepito	6	Singer				20.99%	Advanced

==== Week 6 (October 15 & 16) ====
Contestant	Order	Act	Buzzes and judges' votes			Percentage	Result
Contestant	Order	Act	FMG	Kris	Ai-ai	Percentage	Result
Technojazz	1	Cheerdancing Troupe				2.62%	Eliminated
Jane Ann Arnado	2	Hula Hoop Tricker				10.72%	Eliminated
Kiriko	3	Rappers				11.16%	Advanced
Khalil Joseph Ramos	4	Singer				53.20%	Advanced
Flip Duo	5	Comedic Dancing Duo				7.60%	Eliminated
Jet Barrun	6	Singer				14.70%	Eliminated

=== Finals (October 22 & 23) ===
The Grand Finals was held at the Ynares Sports Center in Antipolo on October 22 & 23, 2011. Several celebrities graced the show during the grand finals. Christian Bautista, Jed Madela, and Nina performed with the top finalist singers; The shows hosts' Billy Crawford and Luis Manzano performed a dance number; Gary Valenciano and son, Paolo Valenciano, with their rendition of "Come Together" of the Beatles; Kamikazee, a Filipino rock band, sang their own song called "Narda"; and season 2's grand winner Marcelito Pomoy performed a song number.

==== Performances & results ====
Contestant	Order	Act	Performance Description	Buzzes			Percentage	Result
Contestant	Order	Act	Performance Description	FMG	Kris	Ai-ai	Percentage	Result
El Gamma Penumbra	1	Shadow Play Group	Performed shadow theater routine based on the Piliin Ang Pilipinas tourism campaign.				8.05%	4th
Maasinhon Trio	2	Singing Trio	Sang "Nais Ko" by Basil Valdez.				22.59%	1st
Loverkada Kids	3	Gymnastics Group and Contortionists	Performed a multitrack gymnastics and dance routine, which included a horizontal wave and a human jump rope.				4.66%	9th
Renagine Pepito	4	Singer	Sang "Note to God" by JoJo.				5.08%	8th
Kiriko	5	Rappers	Performed an original composition, "Pilipinas Got Talent! ('Wag Kang Susuko)."				2.52%	11th
Bringas Brothers	6	Acoustic Duo	Sang "Change the World" by Eric Clapton.				14.03%	3rd
Twin Divas	7	Singing and Dancing Duo	Sang a medley composed of "When You Believe" by Mariah Carey and Whitney Houston and "Let's Get Loud" by Jennifer Lopez.				5.26%	7th
Muriel Lomadilla	8	Singer	Sang "Killing Me Softly with His Song" by Roberta Flack.				3.56%	10th
Lucky Twins	9	Contemporary Dancing Duo	Performed an interpretative dance routine to the tune of "Maalaala Mo Kaya" by Carol Banawa.				1.43%	12th
Sandugo Band	10	Reggae Band	Sang "Yugyugan Na!" by P.O.T.				6.91%	6th
Khalil Joseph Ramos	11	Singer	Sang "Dream On" by Aerosmith.				18.64%	2nd
Synergy	12	Aerial Acrobatics Troupe	Performed a storytelling acrobatics routine set to orchestral music.				7.27%	5th

== Television ratings ==
Television ratings for the third season of Pilipinas Got Talent on ABS-CBN are gathered from two major sources, namely from AGB Nielsen Philippines and Kantar Media - TNS. AGB Nielsen Philippines covers Mega Manila only, while Kantar Media - TNS covers most of the Philippines.

Television ratings of the third season of Pilipinas Got Talent
Stage	Air Date	AGB Nielsen			Kantar Media - TNS			Source	
Stage	Air Date	Rating	Ranking		Rating	Ranking		AGB Nielsen	Kantar Media - TNS
Stage	Air Date	Rating	Timeslot	Primetime	Rating	Timeslot	Primetime	AGB Nielsen	Kantar Media - TNS
Auditions	July 9	08.7%	#2	#7	23.5%	#1	#3		
Auditions	July 10	12.4%	#1	#1	30.5%	#1	#1		
Auditions	July 16	10.0%	#2	#4	26.8%	#1	#2		
Auditions	July 17	11.0%	#1	#1	26.8%	#1	#2		
Auditions	July 23	10.4%	#1	#2	26.8%	#1	#2		
Auditions	July 24	10.8%	#1	#1	28.1%	#1	#1		
Auditions	July 30	10.5%	#1	#2	27.2%	#1	#2		
Auditions	July 31	11.6%	#1	#1	28.7%	#1	#1		
Auditions	August 6	10.7%	#2	#3	26.1%	#1	#2		
Auditions	August 7	10.7%	#1	#3	27.5%	#1	#1		
Auditions	August 13	10.5%	#1	#1	29.6%	#1	#2		
Auditions	August 14	11.4%	#1	#1	30.7%	#1	#1		
Auditions	August 20	10.5%	#1	#2	31.1%	#1	#2		
Auditions	August 21	10.1%	#1	#1	28.2%	#1	#1		
Auditions	August 27	10.3%	#2	#4	27.7%	#1	#3		
Auditions	August 28	11.9%	#1	#1	31.6%	#1	#1		
Judges' Cull	September 3	08.8%	#2	#4	24.4%	#1	#3		
Judges' Cull	September 4	10.0%	#1	#1	22.5%	#1	#2		
Semifinals	September 10	08.0%	#3	#7	21.1%	#1	#4		
Semifinals	September 11	07.9%	#1	#4	24.3%	#1	#2		
Semifinals	September 17	07.9%	#1	#6	21.3%	#1	#4		
Semifinals	September 18	08.9%	#1	#3	23.3%	#1	#2		
Semifinals	September 24	08.2%	#2	#5	22.9%	#1	#3		
Semifinals	September 25	09.4%	#1	#5	24.5%	#1	#2		
Semifinals	October 1	07.0%	#1	#9	17.2%	#1	#7		
Semifinals	October 2	08.3%	#2	#8	23.0%	#1	#2		
Semifinals	October 8	10.1%	#2	#4	27.1%	#1	#2		
Semifinals	October 9	09.4%	#1	#3	24.7%	#1	#2		
Semifinals	October 15	07.1%	#2	#6	20.2%	#1	#4		
Semifinals	October 16	08.3%	#3	#7	21.4%	#1	#3		
Grand Finals	October 22	09.5%	#1	#2	25.7%	#1	#2		
Grand Finals	October 23	12.0%	#1	#1	32.0%	#1	#1		
