= Pilipinas Got Talent =

Philippine television reality show

- Season 7 title card
- Genre: Reality; Talent show
- Created by: Simon Cowell
- Based on: Got Talent by Simon Cowell
- Written by: Stiffany "TP" Adanza; Evette Borromeo; Waldo Bautista
- Directed by: Bobet Vidanes (2010–2018); Jon Raymond Moll (2025)
- Presented by: See Hosts
- Judges: See Judges
- Country of origin: Philippines
- Original language: Filipino
- No. of seasons: 7
- No. of episodes: 227

Production
- Executive producers: Johnny Manahan (2010–2018); Carlo Katigbak; Cory Vidanes; Laurenti Dyogi; Lui L. Andrada
- Production locations: AFP Theater; Dolphy Theatre; Tanghalang Pasigueño; PAGCOR Grand Theater; Smart Araneta Coliseum; Ynares Center; Kia Theatre; Newport Performing Arts Theater; Taytay, Rizal; Mall of Asia Arena; SM Seaside City Cebu; Bren Z. Guiao Convention Center; Studio 10, ABS-CBN Broadcasting Center; Solaire Resort Entertainment City
- Camera setup: Multi-camera setup
- Running time: 45–60 minutes
- Production companies: ABS-CBN Studios; Fremantle; Syco Entertainment

Original release
- Network: ABS-CBN
- Release: February 20, 2010 – April 29, 2018
- Network: Kapamilya Channel (Note: The show also airs on A2Z, Kapamilya Online Live, TV5 and on-demand via iWantTFC.)
- Release: March 29 – June 22, 2025

Pilipinas Got Talent (Note: "Pilipinas" is the Filipino word for the Philippines.) (known and abbreviated as PGT) is a Philippine television reality competition show broadcast by ABS-CBN, Kapamilya Channel and TV5. The show is based on the British reality television franchise Got Talent. Originally hosted by Luis Manzano and Billy Crawford, it aired on the network's Yes Weekend! line up from February 20, 2010 to June 22, 2025. Robi Domingo and Melai Cantiveros serve as the most recent hosts for the seventh season.

The first season aired on ABS-CBN from February 20 to June 13, 2010. A second and a third season aired back to back from February 26 to October 23, 2011. The fourth season aired from February 16 to June 8, 2013, with the fifth season aired from January 23 to May 22, 2016. The sixth season aired from January 6 to April 29, 2018. The seventh season aired on Kapamilya Channel from March 29 to June 22, 2025.

To date, there have been seven winners: Jovit Baldivino, Marcelito Pomoy, the Maasinhon Trio, Roel Manlangit, Power Duo, Kristel de Catalina and Cardong Trumpo. The first four are singing acts, while the two are interpretative dance acts, and the latter is non-singing or dance act.

== Development ==
ABS-CBN acquired the Got Talent franchise on 2009, advertising it as "the first nationwide talent reality show in the Philippines," although other talent shows from other networks are aired with a similar format, such as Talentadong Pinoy on TV5.

A spin-off of the format, announced in 2023, GMA acquired the French version of the Got Talent format, Battle of the Judges.

== Format ==
Anyone can join and showcase their talents in the audition. At the sound of four (three, in seasons 1–4) buzzers from the judges, the auditionees are asked to stop their act. With at least three (two, in seasons 1–4) approval votes from the judges, they are automatically in the list for Judges Cuts, where judges have to pick only 36 acts (Golden Acts are included in the list, starting with the fifth season) that will move to the semi-finals. Acts will compete against each other to gain the audience's support and win the prize money as well as the title of Pilipinas Got Talent.

== Overview ==
=== Auditions ===
Viewers can join through text and online registration via the Internet. Auditions are held in key cities such as Manila, Baguio, Batangas, Cebu, Davao, and Cagayan de Oro.

==== Pre-auditions ====
This is the competition's first round. Major auditions were held in major Philippine cities. Since the second season, in addition to the major auditions, there have been mini-auditions held in various provinces and cities throughout the Philippines and judged by the Pilipinas Got Talent staff. This round is held several months before the auditions for the judges. Contestants can also audition online by submitting their audition video through the show's official website. Acts who advance to the next round must audition in front of the judges and a live audience.

==== Live auditions ====
Following the pre-auditions, acts audition in front of four celebrity judges. The judges have the option of ending an act's performance early by pressing their red buzzer, which illuminates their corresponding X above the stage. If an act receives Xs from all of the judges, they must stop performing. After an act ends, each judge gives the act a "Yes" if they like it and want it to advance to the next stage of the competition, and a "No" if they don't like it and don't want to see it again. At least three judges (two, in seasons 1–4) must give an act a "Yes" for the act to proceed.

The Golden Buzzer is introduced in Season 5. Each judge may only use the Golden Buzzer once per season. Any act that receives the Golden Buzzer advances directly to the live semifinals. From the sixth season onwards, the hosts were given the authority to press it as one.

Large audiences have played a role in the judging process, as their reactions to an act's performance can swing or influence a judge's vote. As a result, the audience effectively acts as an "additional judge".

=== Judges' Cull ===
The acts that have passed the live auditions round will advance to this round. The judges will deliberate on all the acts that passed the auditions in this round. From seasons 1 through 5, only thirty-six (36) acts advance to the live shows. However, it was reduced to twenty-eight (28) on season 6, and it was further reduced to twenty-four (24) on season 7.

=== Live shows ===
Following the deliberation of the judges on the top 36 (seasons 1–5), 28 (season 6), and 24 (season 7) acts in the judges' cull, each act will compete in a battle of talents in the live shows, with more than six acts qualifying for the finals. Judges can still stop the current act's performance at this point by pressing their buzzers; this does not necessarily mean that the act is eliminated; the public can still vote for the buzzed act to advance to the grand finals. There are currently three types of live shows before the finals: quarter-finals, semi-finals, and wildcard rounds.

==== Quarter-finals ====
The quarterfinals were first introduced in the second season and then appeared in the fourth season, with six acts performing each week. After the six assigned artists for the week have done their separate acts, the public and judges will vote for one act to go to the semi-finals. The first semi-finalist will be the act with the most public votes, while the second semi-finalist will be the act with the majority of judges' votes. The second-placed performer in the public vote will be the second semi-finalist if the judges' votes are tied.

==== Semi-finals ====
The audience and judges will vote for one act to go to the grand finals after each of the six performers assigned for the week have performed their allotted acts. The first finalist will be the act with the most public votes, while the second finalist will be the act with the majority of judges' votes. The second-placed performer in the public vote will be the second finalist if the judges' votes are tied.

The fourth season introduced a new voting format in which three acts would be chosen by the judges and the general public, with two acts coming from the judges and one from the general public (the act with the most votes). Two votes will be given to each judge for the two acts they want to advance to the finals.

==== Wildcard rounds ====
The wildcard rounds were first used in the second season, where acts that lose or did not receive a judge's vote were chosen to perform once more in front of the judges and audience to advance to the finals. The two spots reserved for these wildcard acts on the finale were up for grabs, and the top three acts with the highest percentage of votes were chosen to compete the following day. This was put into place following the semifinal round and before the grand finals.

=== Grand finals ===
The acts that managed to pass through the first four eliminations (three in the first three seasons) will compete in a live grand finale event for a final performance in the show. This time, the winner will be up to the hands of the public as the grand winner will be announced as the act with the most public votes. For seasons five and six, the winner was determined by taking half of the votes cast by the general public and the other half based on the judges' scores. The grand winner receives a total amount of two million pesos (₱2,000,000) while the second and third placers will receive one hundred thousand pesos (₱100,000) and fifty thousand pesos (₱50,000). Nevertheless, those who were not able to reach the top 3 will receive consolation prizes.

== Seasons ==
=== Summary of Seasons ===
Season	Premiere date	Finale date	Episodes	No. of Finalists	Winner	Runner-up	Third place	Presenters	Judges	
Season	Premiere date	Finale date	Episodes	No. of Finalists	Winner	Runner-up	Third place	Presenters	Main	Guest
1	February 20, 2010	June 13, 2010	33	12	Jovit Baldivino † (16 year-old singer)	Baguio Metamorphosis (Hip-hop group)	Velasco Brothers (Breakdancing group)	Luis Manzano; Billy Crawford	Ai-Ai delas Alas; Kris Aquino; Freddie M. Garcia	none
2	February 26, 2011	June 26, 2011	35	14	Marcelito Pomoy (26 year-old falsetto singer)	Happy Feet (Tap dancing duo)	Freestylers (Dancing crew)	Luis Manzano; Billy Crawford	Ai-Ai delas Alas; Kris Aquino; Freddie M. Garcia	none
3	July 9, 2011	October 23, 2011	32	12	Maasinhon Trio (Singing trio)	Khalil Ramos (15 year-old singer)	Bringas Brothers (Acoustic duo)	Luis Manzano; Billy Crawford	Ai-Ai delas Alas; Kris Aquino; Freddie M. Garcia	Luis Manzano; Billy Crawford
4	February 16, 2013	June 8, 2013	33	6	Roel Manlangit (13 year-old singer)	Frankendal Fabroa (29 year-old wheel dancer)	MP3 Band (Acoustic musicians)	Luis Manzano; Billy Crawford	Ai-Ai delas Alas; Kris Aquino; Freddie M. Garcia	Vice Ganda^{1}
5	January 23, 2016	May 22, 2016	36	12	Power Duo (Contemporary dance duo)	Amazing Pyra (Poi dancer)	Ody Sto. Domingo (31 year-old magician)	Luis Manzano; Billy Crawford	Vice Ganda; Robin Padilla; Angel Locsin; Freddie M. Garcia	none
6	January 6, 2018	April 29, 2018	33	10	Kristel de Catalina (Spiral pole dancer)	Julius & Rhea (Wheelchair dance duo)	Joven Olvido (28 year-old comedian)	Billy Crawford; Toni Gonzaga	Vice Ganda; Robin Padilla; Angel Locsin; Freddie M. Garcia	none
7	March 29, 2025	June 22, 2025	25	8	Cardong Trumpo (Trumpo spinning act)	Femme MNL (hip-hop dance group)	Carl Quion (magic act)	Robi Domingo; Melai Cantiveros	Eugene Domingo; Donny Pangilinan; Kathryn Bernardo; Freddie M. Garcia	none

1. ^ Ai-Ai delas Alas was not able to attend the fifth semifinal week due to illness. Due to this, Vice Ganda was asked to take her duties, but only as a replacement judge for the week.

=== Season details ===
==== Season 1 (2010) ====
Pilipinas Got Talent title card used from Seasons 1 to 3.

The first season began on February 20, 2010. It was held in some major cities in the Philippines like Baguio, Batangas, Cebu, Cagayan de Oro, Davao, and Metro Manila where the hopefuls are judged by judges Ai-Ai delas Alas, Kris Aquino and Freddie "FMG" Garcia. From thousands who auditioned, 220 acts made it to the Judges' Cull, where the top 36 semi-finalists were selected.

The semi-finals were held on AFP Theater in Camp Aguinaldo from the first to fourth performance night and in Tanghalang Pasigueño from the fifth to sixth performance night. On the other hand, the results are always held in Dolphy Theater in ABS-CBN. The season ended last June 12 and 13, 2010, at the Araneta Coliseum in Quezon City, Metro Manila, where the twelve acts competed for the prize. Sixteen-year-old singer Jovit Baldivino from Batangas was declared the winner of the season.

==== Season 2 (2011) ====
The second season premiered on February 26, 2011, replacing Star Circle Quest and Star Power respectively. Ai-Ai delas Alas, Kris Aquino, and Freddie Garcia reprised their judging duties from first season. The hosts, Billy Crawford and Luis Manzano, also reprised their hosting roles, and they were joined by Nikki Gil. The major auditions for the second season were held in Dagupan, Batangas, Naga, Cebu, Davao and Metro Manila. It is also the season where they held micro-auditions in other cities and provinces in the Philippines where hopefuls are judged by the show's staff.

There are 174 acts who passed the auditions and made it to the Judges' Cut. The Luzon and Visayas auditionees where selected in Dolphy Theater in Quezon City where 26 acts made it to the semi-finals. On the other hand, the remaining 10 acts from Mindanao were visited by the judges in their respective hometown. The semi-finals were held in PAGCOR Theater in Parañaque City. In addition, there is a wildcard round for those semi-finalists who made it to the top three highest audience votes but lost the judges' votes are given a chance to compete again in order to make it to the grand finals. Only two will be chosen for this round.

On June 25 and 26, 2011, the season ended in Araneta Coliseum of Quezon City, Metro Manila where the fourteen acts competed. Falsetto singer Marcelito Pomoy from Cavite was crowned as the winner of the season.

==== Season 3 (2011) ====
The hosts announced in the grand finals of Season 2 that the show will return again within two weeks. The third season premiered last July 9, 2011, on ABS-CBN. Major auditions are held in Baguio, Manila, Batangas, Cebu, Bacolod, Tacloban, Iloilo, Cagayan de Oro, Davao, and General Santos. There are also mini-auditions held in almost 70 municipalities and cities in the country. In addition, there are online auditions where participants are asked to upload their videos in Pilipinas Got Talent website. In this season, Luis Manzano and Billy Crawford became a judge substitute for a while of Ai-Ai delas Alas and Kris Aquino, respectively.

After the nationwide auditions (including online auditions), 187 acts made it to the next round called "The Judges Cull" where the judges were able to make a review of the contenders who passed the auditions which they are going to choose the top 36 semi-finalists. The Judges' Cull was held in ABS-CBN Studios in Quezon City where 24 acts from Luzon and Mindanao made it to the semi-finals. In addition, the 12 acts from Visayas were visited by the judges as well as Billy Crawford and Luis Manzano in their respective hometowns.

On October 23 and 24, 2011, the season ended in the Ynares Sports Complex (now Ynares Center) in Antipolo, Rizal where the twelve acts competed. The singing trio Maasinhon Trio from Southern Leyte was announced as the winner of the season.

==== Season 4 (2013) ====
Pilipinas Got Talent title card used from Seasons 4 and 5.

A teaser for the fourth season were aired after results night of The X Factor Philippines on July 29, 2012. Major auditions were held in key cities like Quezon City, Bacolod, General Santos, Cebu, Cagayan de Oro, and Davao City. In addition, winners of TFCkat, an international competition made by The Filipino Channel which is held in Filipino key areas all over the world, were also given slots for auditions in the Philippines. The show premiered on February 16, 2013.

After the nationwide auditions, 104 acts made it to the Judges Cull where the three judges made a review of their auditions in order to determine the top 36 quarterfinalists. This is the season which marks the introduction of semifinal round where the top 12 acts who won the quarterfinals will compete for the six slots in the grand finals.

On June 1 and 2, 2013, the season ended in PAGCOR Grand Theater in Parañaque, Metro Manila. Thirteen year-old singer Roel Manlangit from Valencia, Bukidnon was hailed as the winner of the season.

==== Season 5 (2016) ====
On May 17, 2015, in ASAP 20, Luis Manzano confirmed that the show will return for its fifth season and particularly be returning as host as well, following the success of the four Filipino acts who competed in the grand finals of Asia's Got Talent. Two of those acts were formerly part of this show and these are: singer Gerphil Geraldine "Fame" Flores, who competed in Season 1 but lost the judges' vote in the 4th semifinal week, and shadow play group El Gamma Penumbra, who competed in Season 3 but placed 4th in the finals. Flores placed third while El Gamma was declared the winner of the first season of the said regional franchise of Got Talent. On January 8, 2016, ABS-CBN announced that Garcia would return as judge for the fifth consecutive season, Ai-Ai delas Alas will not return due to her transfer to GMA Network after her contract expired and 16 years of association, while Kris Aquino cited her health problems. Therefore, numerous teasers are being released prior to the change of the lineup and two weeks leading to the premiere, actress Angel Locsin, actor Robin Padilla, and comedian Vice Ganda will be joining the judging panel. The season will premiere on January 23, 2016, replacing the weeknight slots of second season of Your Face Sounds Familiar, however, the filler movie block Kapamilya Weekend Specials filled the vacated timeslot of the aforementioned show.

The grand finale was held on May 21 and 22, 2016 at the SM Mall of Asia Arena, Pasay, where dancesport duo Power Duo from Rizal became the first non-singing act to win the show.

==== Season 6 (2018) ====
The sixth season of Pilipinas Got Talent premiered on January 6, 2018. On June 3, 2017, Billy Crawford announced that there will be auditions for this season on It's Showtime. A teaser was shown during the commercial break of It's Showtime and I Can Do That. Manzano cannot return to host the program due to I Can See Your Voice and was replaced by Toni Gonzaga. Garcia failed to appear on all the liveshows due to the death of his wife.

The Grand Finale, so called "The Greatest Showdown", was held on April 28 and 29, 2018 at the Bren Z. Guiao Convention Center & Sports Complex at San Fernando, Pampanga, where a 32-year-old spiral pole dancer Kristel de Catalina also from Rizal won the season, became the second non-singing act to win the show.

The season was re-aired last March 2020 as part of ABS-CBN's programming changes due to the enhanced community quarantines imposed in Luzon, until the network was shut down.

==== Season 7 (2025) ====
Prior to the semi-finals of the sixth season, auditions for seventh season has been announced. Due to the network's shutdown and the COVID-19 pandemic, it caused delays for schedules of pre-auditions and live auditions.

On November 23, 2022, it was announced during the TV5 Trade Launch 2022 that the program has been renewed for its seventh season after a five-year hiatus. For the first time, the show will air on TV5 along with Kapamilya Channel and A2Z. This is also the first time that the program will not air on the main ABS-CBN terrestrial channel after the network was issued a cease and desist order from the National Telecommunications Commission on May 5, 2020, due to the lapse of its broadcast franchise, but also delay.

On October 15, 2024, a teaser appeared on Kapamilya Online Live teasing the return of the show for its seventh season after a six-year hiatus. Auditions for the season began on October 17 for online auditions and December 14 for physical auditions. The season premiered on March 29, 2025.

The Grand Finale was held on June 21 and 22, 2025 at the Theatre at Solaire Resort, Entertainment City in Parañaque, where a 55-year-old trompo spinner Cardong Trumpo from Cavite won the season, became the third non-singing act to win the show. It is also the first time a non-dancer to win the show, and the first time a non-golden buzzer act to win since the feature was introduced in the fifth season.

== Hosts ==
Pilipinas Got Talent judges and presenters; from left: Ai-Ai delas Alas, Kris Aquino, Freddie M. Garcia, Luis Manzano and Billy Crawford.

Host(s)	Seasons						
Host(s)	1	2	3	4	5	6	7
Luis							
Billy							
Iya							
Nikki							
Toni							
Robi							
Melai							
Key Main Host Guest Host

Initially, Pilipinas Got Talent was supposed to be hosted by Kris Aquino, but was later moved to the judging panel and the tandem of Billy Crawford and Luis Manzano became the hosts of the show until the fifth season. Actresses Iya Villania and Nikki Gil have served as guest hosts. In season 6, Manzano was replaced by Toni Gonzaga as host, joining Crawford. In season 7, Crawford and Gonzaga were replaced by Robi Domingo and Melai Cantiveros.

Aside from the main hosts, there were additional presenters that presented its companion shows. Marc Abaya hosted the show's first spin-off, Pilipinas Got More Talent, which only aired during the first season. Jervi Wrightson (credited as Jervi Li and more known as KaladKaren), hosted the show's online companion program entitled PGT Exclusives during season 6. The said digital companion show returned for the seventh season; she was replaced by Wize Estabillo and Lorraine Galvez, who are also hosts of It's Showtime's online program, Showtime Online Ü.

== Judges ==
The current judges of Pilipinas Got Talent

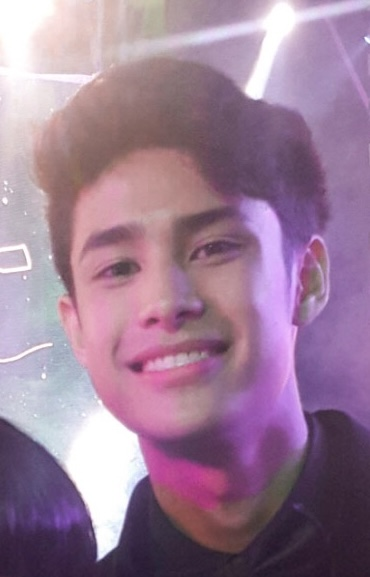
Donny Pangilinan

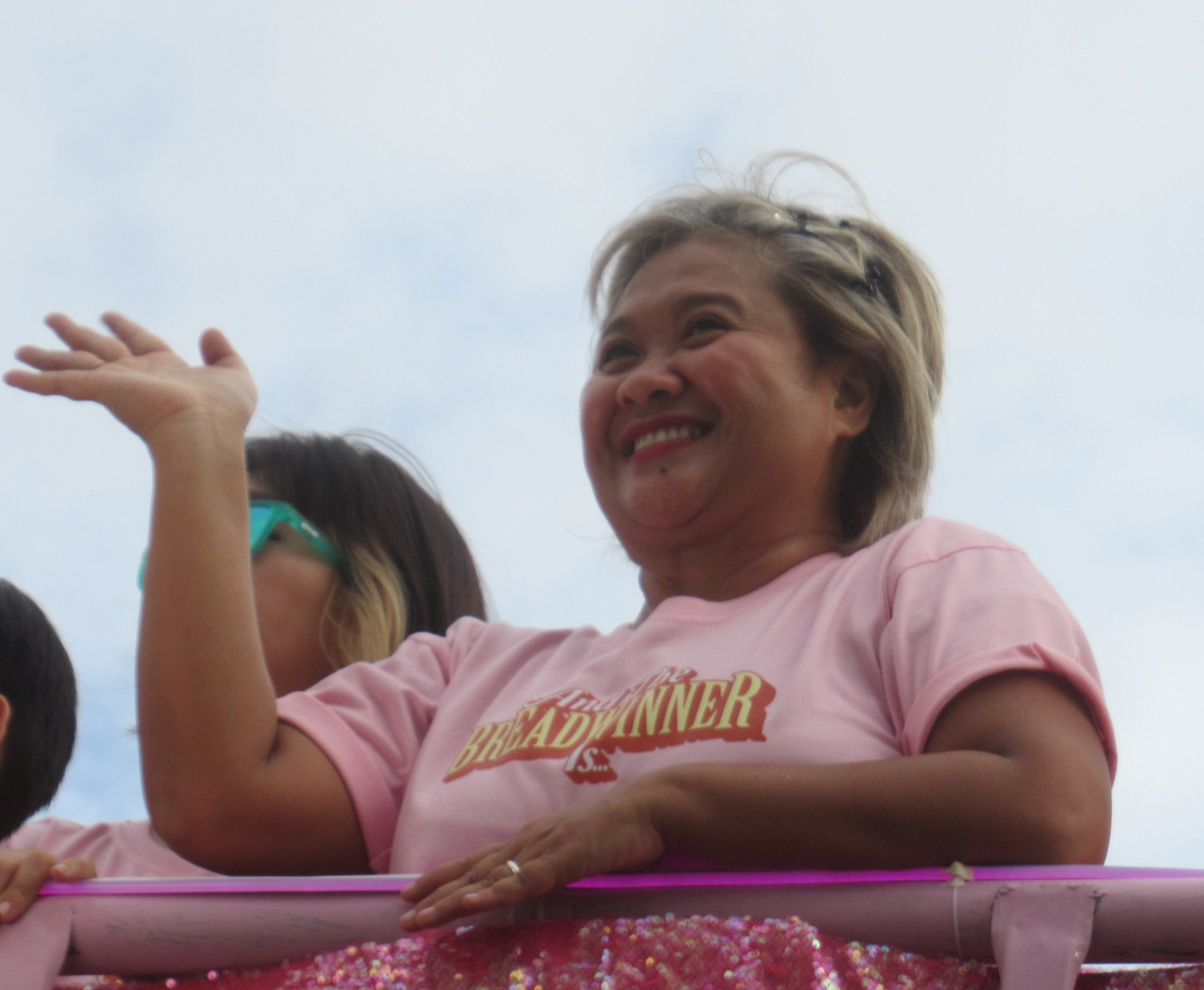
Eugene Domingo

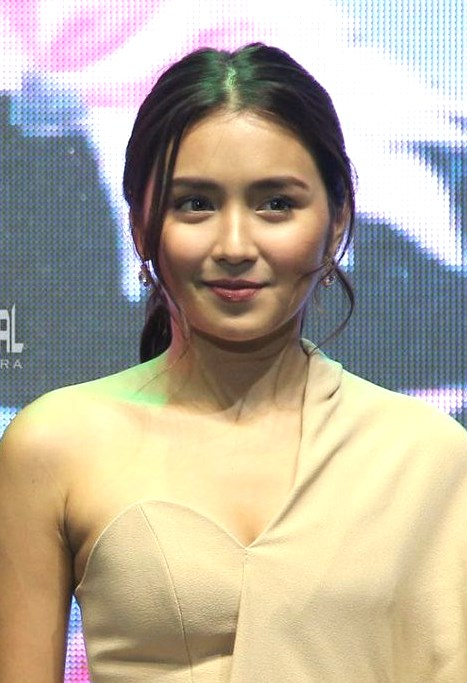
Kathryn Bernardo

Judges	Seasons						
Judges	1	2	3	4	5	6	7
FMG							
Kris							
Ai-Ai							
Luis							
Billy							
Vice Ganda							
Angel							
Robin							
Donny							
Eugene							
Kathryn							
Key: Main Judge Guest Judge

From season 1 until season 4, the judges of the show consists of Kris Aquino, who was earlier tapped for the hosting gig, backed out from judging at first. However, she announced at an episode on Showbiz News Ngayon that she has resumed her judging duties. She joins former ABS-CBN President and COO Freddie M. Garcia, and comedian Ai-Ai delas Alas. In season 3, Luis Manzano and Billy Crawford served as guest judges, temporary replacing Ai-Ai delas Alas and Kris Aquino as respectively during the auditions. Comedian Vice Ganda replaced Ai-Ai delas Alas during one of the quarterfinal in season 4.

In season 5, the judging panel has been changed. Ai-Ai delas Alas and Kris Aquino did not return to the judging panel. Delas Alas did not return due to her transfer to GMA Network, while Aquino cited her health problems. ABS-CBN board member Freddie M. Garcia confirmed his return as judge. On January 8, 2016, a teaser during FPJ's Ang Probinsyano revealed that actress Angel Locsin will be one of the judges. On January 9, 2016, a teaser during It's Showtime revealed that actor Robin Padilla will join Garcia and Locsin in the judging panel and on January 10, 2016, Vice Ganda was revealed to be the last judge that will join the other three during ASAP.

In the grand finals of season 5, host Luis Manzano and Billy Crawford announced that the show will have its sixth season. In the recent teasers released by ABS-CBN, it showed every judges from season 5 in each teasers together with Got Talent creator Simon Cowell, Vice Ganda is the first judge to be revealed, followed by Angel Locsin in the next day after the first teaser was shown, Robin Padilla coming in third judge to be revealed, and lastly Freddie M. Garcia. All of them are from the previous season and going to return to judging panel this upcoming season. Toni Gonzaga replaced Luis Manzano as host while Billy Crawford resumed his hosting duty. In season 6, Freddie M. Garcia missed the live semifinals and the finals due to the death of his spouse.

For season 7, Garcia returned as a judge after being absent on the live shows of season 6. Eugene Domingo, Donny Pangilinan, and Kathryn Bernardo joined the judging panel, replacing Vice Ganda, Padilla, and Locsin, respectively.

Judges gallery

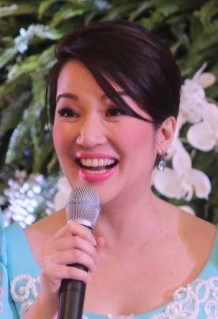
Kris Aquino (2010–2013)

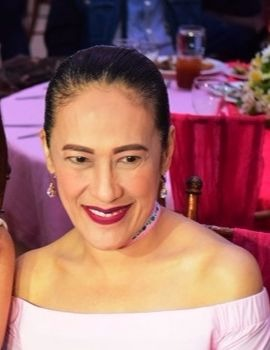
Ai-Ai delas Alas (2010–2013)

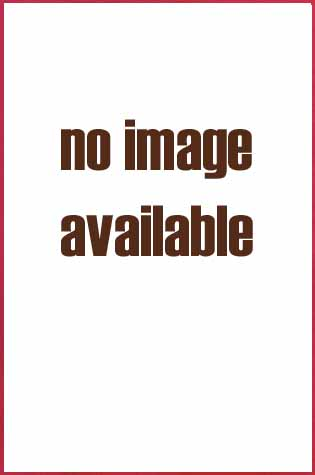
Freddie M. Garcia (2010–13, 2016–)

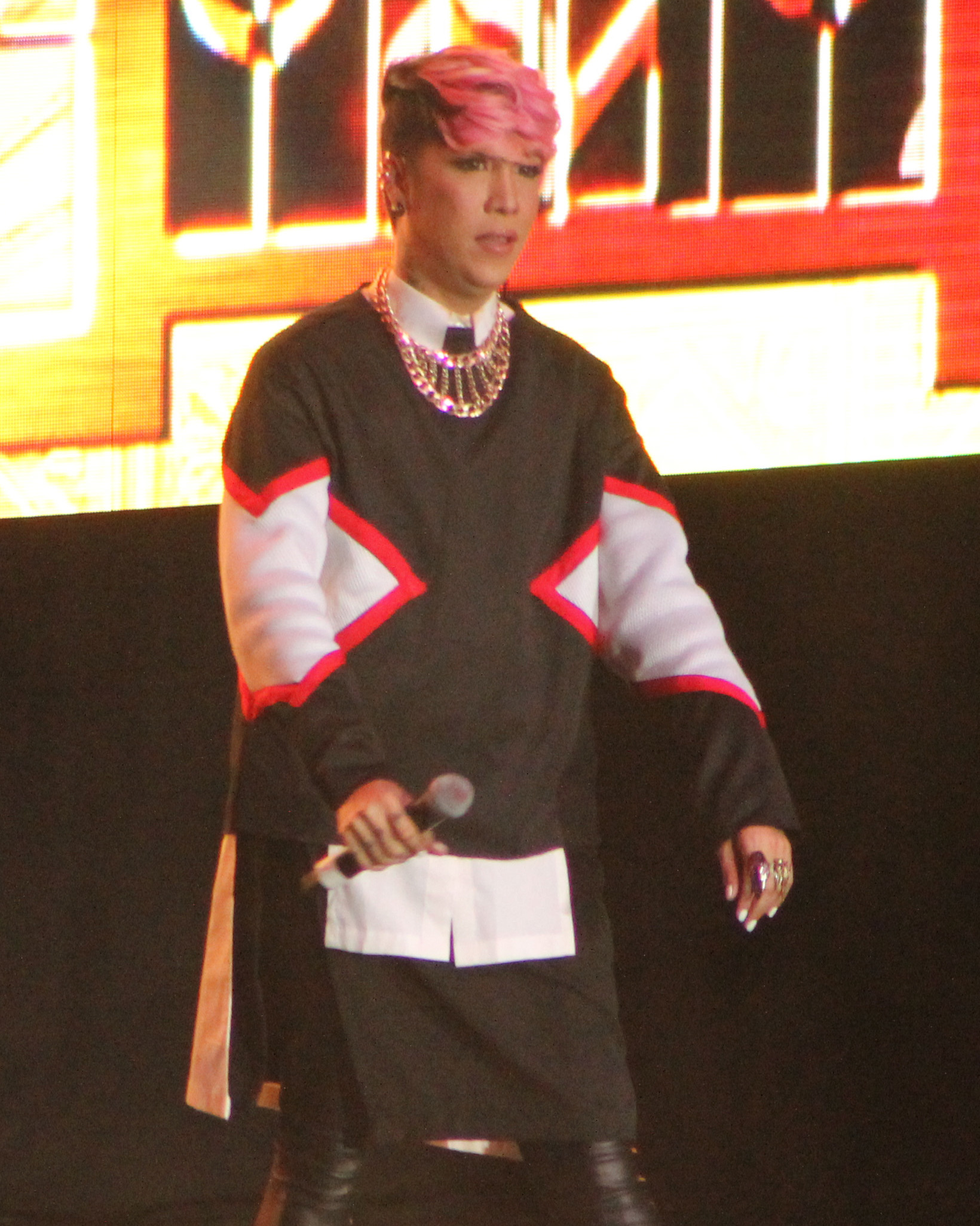
Vice Ganda (2013, 2016–2018)

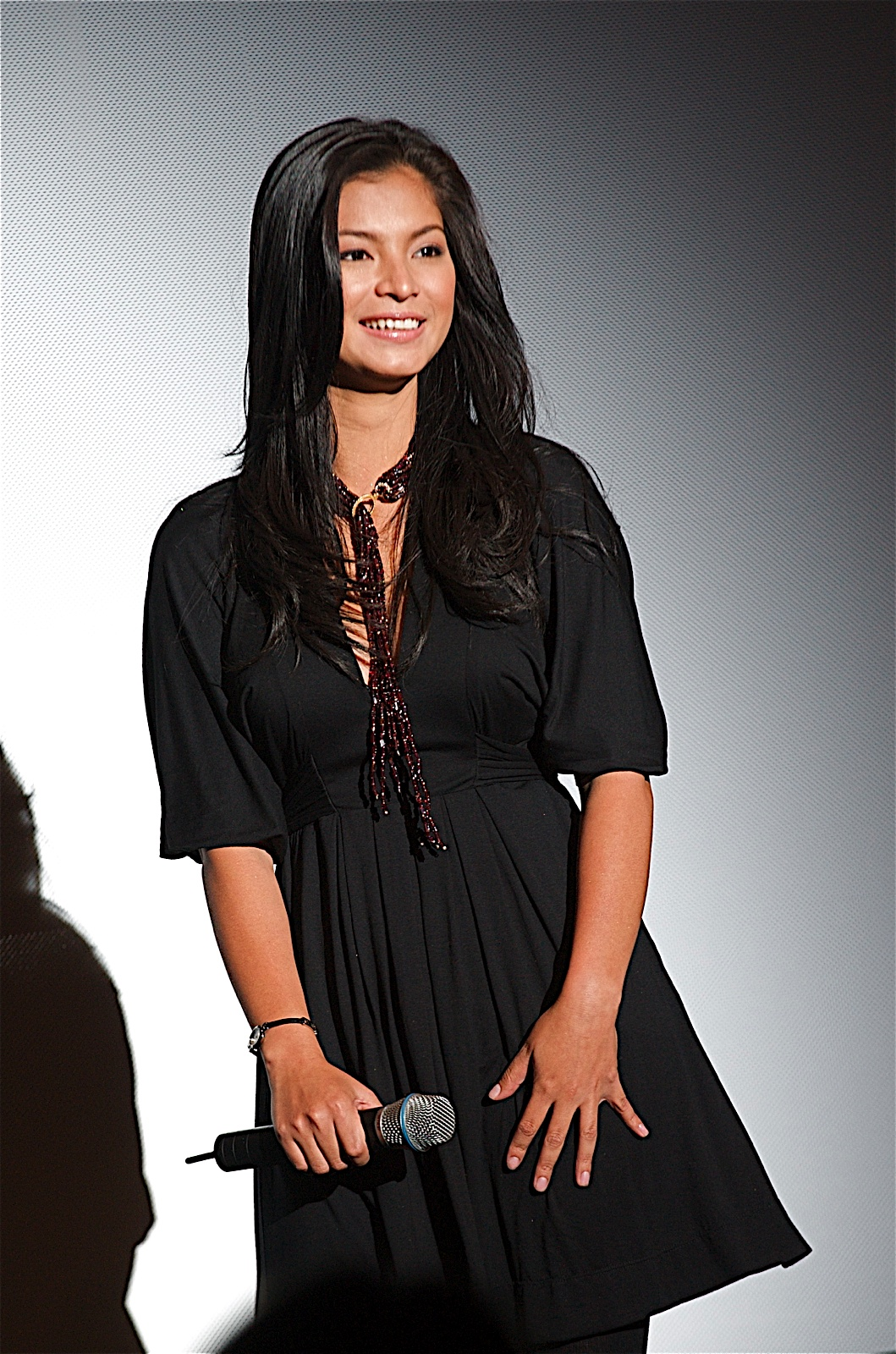
Angel Locsin (2016–2018)

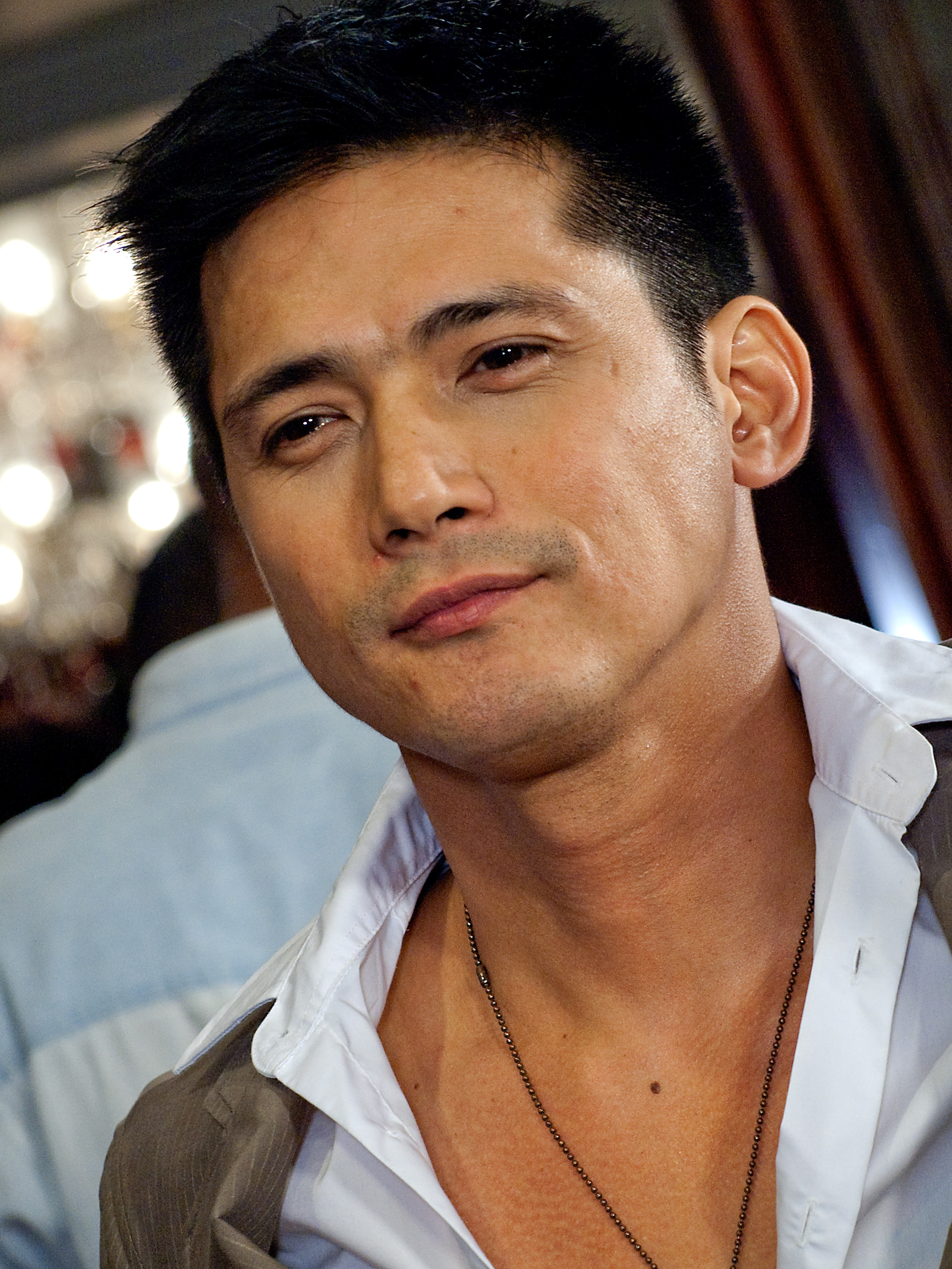
Robin Padilla (2016–2018)

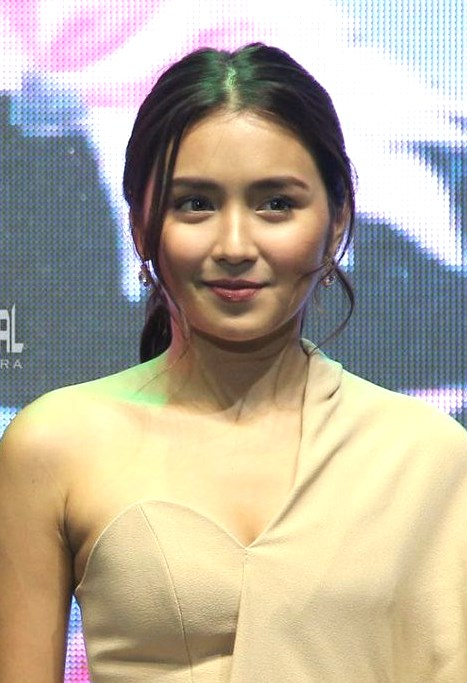
Kathryn Bernardo (2025–)

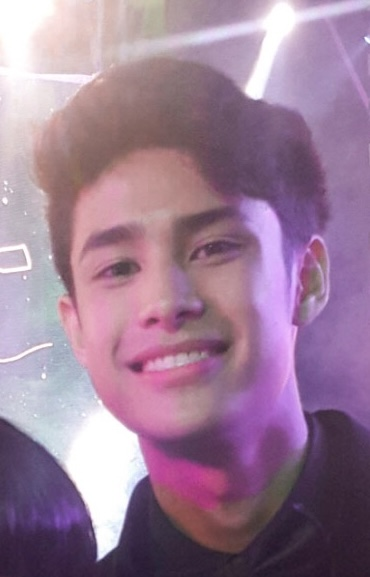
Donny Pangilinan (2025–)

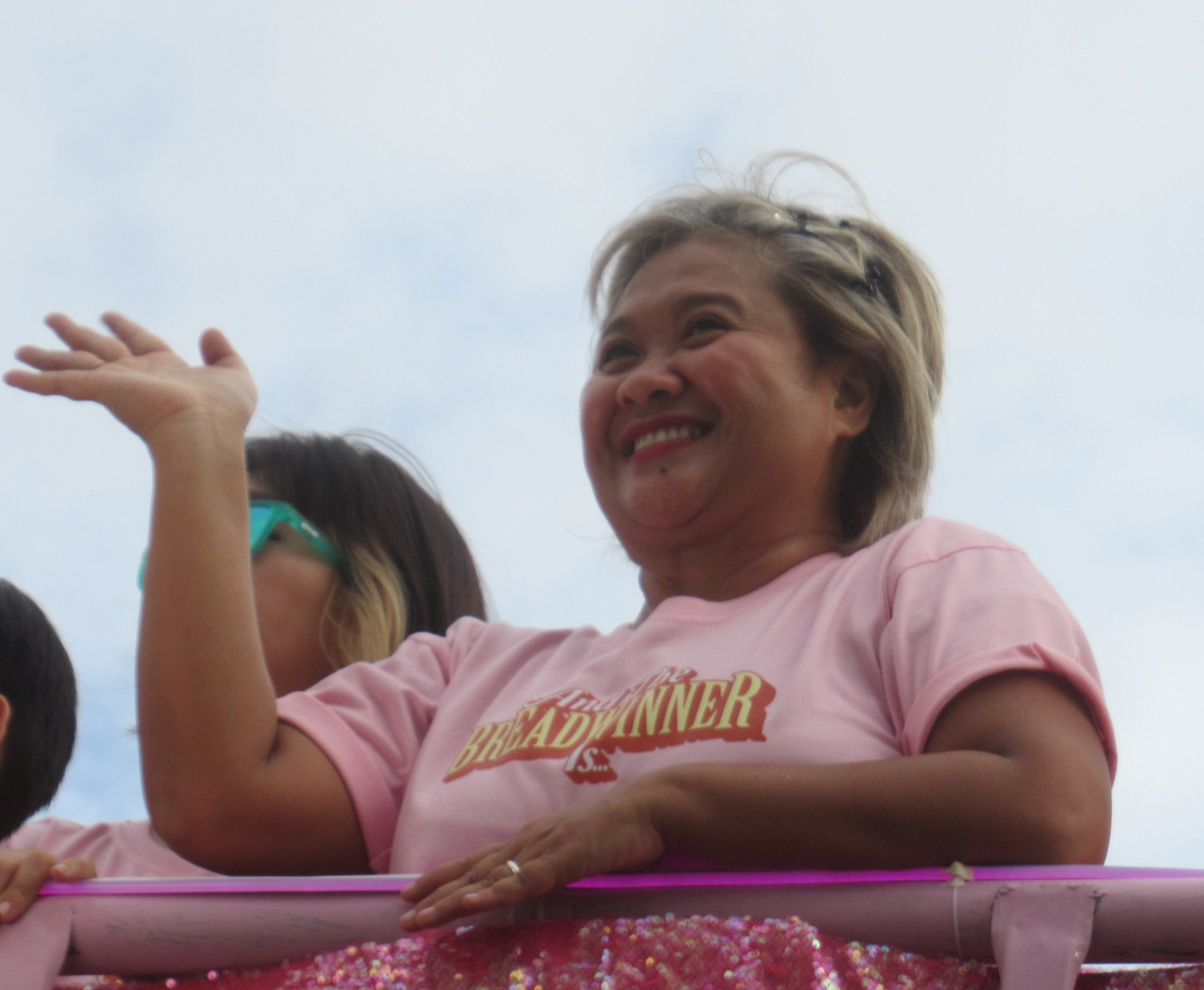
Eugene Domingo (2025–)

== Golden Buzzer ==
Introduced on the fifth season, the Golden Buzzer has the ability to send a contestant or act to proceed immediately to the semi-finals, skipping the Judges' Cull phase. Represented by a golden button that is placed at the center of the judges' table, each judge has a chance to press the Golden Buzzer only once per season. The hosts were given an opportunity to press the Golden Buzzer as one only once during the auditions, starting on the sixth season.

Since the introduction of the golden buzzer, winners of the respective seasons have received it during their audition. Season 6 is currently the only season where all golden buzzer acts proceeded to the finals.

Color key
Winner
Top 3
Reached the Finals

Season	Golden Buzzer Acts				
Season	Vice	Robin	Angel	FMG	Luis & Billy
5	Power Impact; Dance group, 6th place	Power Duo; Dance duo, winner	Liquid Concept; Flairtending duo, semifinalist	Mark Dune Basmayor; Hat tricker, semifinalist	Ineligible
6	Vice	Robin	Angel	FMG	Toni & Billy
6	Kristel de Catalina; Spiral pole dancer, winner	Nocturnal Dance Company; Dance group, 6th place	Julius and Rhea; Wheelchair dance duo, 2nd place	Bardilleranz; Bar exhibition group, 5th place	DWC Aeon Flex; Acrobatic exhibition duo, 4th place
7	FMG	Kathryn	Eugene	Donny	Robi & Melai
7	Fire Motion Lightrix; Light dance group, semi-finalist	Jasmine Flores; Acrobatic dancer, semi-finalist	Jeffrey Bangcaya; Fire balancer, 5th place	Esang Kirstin Belanio; Rock singer, semi-finalist	Femme MNL; Dance group, 2nd place

== Regular contestants ==
As of the seventh season, nine acts (dubbed as loyal auditionees by the show) have returned to audition on subsequent seasons. Six of these acts advanced to the live shows, and three of which were not chosen again for subsequent attempts.

Acts	Number of attempts	Live Shows	Notes
Jeremiah Velasco	5 (as of 2016)	No_{(1–5)}	Jeremiah has appeared in the first five seasons of the series. He got through the auditions, but was eliminated in Judges' Cull in the fifth season. He has also appeared in the inaugural season of Asia's Got Talent, but received four disapproval votes from the judges.
Kapidamu Band	2 (as of 2011)	Yes_{(1)} Yes_{(2)}	Kapidamu Band first auditioned in the first season, but lost the judges' vote during the semi-finals. In the second season, the group received one of the lowest vote percentages during the semi-finals and was eliminated.
Angel Fire	2 (as of 2018)	Yes_{(5)} Yes_{(6)}	Angel Fire auditioned for the fifth season but did not advance to the finals. In the sixth season, the group re-auditioned as Angel Fire New Gen, with only one member from the original group remaining. They were chosen to take part in the live shows again. However, the group did not make it to the finals, finishing outside of the top three.
Rico The Magician	2 (as of 2018)	Yes_{(2)} Yes_{(6)}	Rico the Magician finished seventh as a grand finalist in the second season. He later decided to audition again in the sixth season, and he was chosen to participate in the live shows once more. He was chosen by the judges and appeared in the fifth week of the semi-finals. He received 6.02% of the vote, falling short of the top three.
Aloha Philippines	2 (as of 2018)	No_{(1)} Yes_{(6)}	Aloha Philippines auditioned for the first season but were not chosen for the live shows. They auditioned again in Season 6 and were chosen to perform in the live shows. They advanced to the semi-finals but fell short of the top three, receiving only 2.81% of the vote.
Lito Tamayo	2 (as of 2018)	No_{(5)} No_{(6)}	Lito first appeared as a muscle flex performer in the fifth season. He received two buzzers from Angel and FMG but was not chosen to appear in the live shows. He re-auditioned with a comedy act during the sixth season, but was not chosen to perform in the live shows.
Ody Sto. Domingo	2 (as of 2025)	Yes_{(5)} Yes_{(7)}	Magician Ody Sto. Domingo auditioned for the fifth season and was chosen for the live shows; he finished third overall. He re-auditioned with a magic act for the seventh season, and was once again selected for the live shows. He finished in eighth place.
Manza	2 (as of 2025)	No_{(5)} Yes_{(7)}	Pole dancer Manza first auditioned on the fifth season under his real name, Nique Mancha, however he was not selected for the live shows. He re-auditioned for the seventh season with a drag aerial balancing act and was selected for the live shows. He finished in fourth place.
Jepthah Callitong	2 (as of 2025)	Yes_{(6)} No_{(7)}	Magician Jepthah Callitong, known as "Wow Magic", first auditioned for the sixth season and was selected for the live shows. He re-auditioned again for the seventh season with the same act under a different phrase "So Scary" but was not selected for the live shows.
Pandalan Twins	2 (as of 2025)	No_{(5)} No_{(7)}	Acrobatic duo Raymart and Raymond Pandalan first auditioned for the fifth season as Happy Twins, and they were shown on a montage of those who got 'Yes' votes. However, they were not selected for the live shows. They re-auditioned again for the seventh season with the same act under the name Pandalan Twins, and were still not selected for the live shows.

== Other appearances ==
Pilipinas Got Talent has seen seven acts that have joined on international versions of Got Talent, or have participated in any other local dance or singing competitions.

=== International appearances ===
Pilipinas Got Talent has seen six acts that have joined on international versions of Got Talent. The list below only shows the contestants that have auditioned in the show and then auditioned on any international version of Got Talent, such as America's Got Talent, Britain's Got Talent, or Asia's Got Talent.

List of Pilipinas Got Talent contestants that auditioned on Got Talent's international versions
Contestant	Act	Season(s) participated		Status	Notes
Contestant	Act	Local	International	Status	Notes
El Gamma Penumbra	Shadow play group	Season 3; 4th place	Asia's Got Talent (season 1)	Winner	El Gamma Penumbra made their mark during the inaugural season of Asia's Got Talent when they showcased their exceptional talent during the audition round. Their performance was so remarkable that they earned a golden buzzer from judge Anggun, propelling them directly to the semi-finals. In the third semi-finals round, the group delivered yet another stunning performance, earning their second golden buzzer. Their consistent brilliance and captivating acts led them to emerge victorious in the competition, surpassing 24 other semi-finalists to claim the title.
Geraldine "Gerphil" Flores	Singing	Season 1 Semi-finalist	Asia's Got Talent (season 1)	Third Place	Gerphil participated in the first season of Asia's Got Talent by singing "Speak Softly Love" composed by Nino Rota, and popularized by Andy Williams. She then received a golden buzzer from David Foster, which brought her to the semi-finals. Then, in the second semi-finals round, she sang "(Where Do I Begin?) Love Story" by Williams, and proceeded to the finals after receiving enough votes to be in the Top Two. Lastly, she sang the operatic version of The Impossible Dream which led her to place third in the competition.
Marcelito Pomoy	Singing	Season 2 Winner	America's Got Talent: The Champions (season 2)	Grand Finalist (Fourth Place)	Renowned for his remarkable talent in transitioning between singing voices, Pomoy auditioned for the second season of America's Got Talent: The Champions in 2020. He captivated the audience by flawlessly performing both the tenor and soprano parts of Celine Dion and Andrea Bocelli’s “The Prayer,” progressing to the preliminaries, akin to the semi-finals in the local version. Employing the same technique, he astounded the judges by flawlessly singing both parts of "Time to Say Goodbye" by Bocelli, securing a place in the finals. For his ultimate performance, Pomoy delivered an enchanting rendition of both parts of "Beauty and the Beast" by Dion and Peabo Bryson, the iconic song from the film of the same name. His journey culminated with a fourth-place finish.
Philip Galit (Shadow Ace)	Shadow play	Season 5 Semi-Finalist	Asia's Got Talent (season 3)	Grand Finalist (Top 6)	Renowned for his captivating shadow play performances, Shadow Ace first auditioned on the third season of Asia's Got Talent, where he was given a golden buzzer. During the semi-finals, he performed a comedy shadow performance related to each of the three judges. Highlights included "Park" dancing to "Gangnam Style" by Psy (complete with horses), "Foster" trying his hand at break dancing despite his age, "Anggun" having water problems in the bathroom, and several lovers' spats. Advancing to the finals, he performed a shadow play routine about a gay man's journey from heartbreak after a previous relationship into becoming a successful trans woman performer while facing prejudice and the like along the way. Songs used in the performance were "I Will Survive" by Gloria Gaynor, "Like a Virgin" by Madonna, the disco version of "One Night Only", and "And I Am Telling You I'm Not Going," the latter two from the musical Dreamgirls.
Philip Galit (Shadow Ace)	Shadow play	Season 5 Semi-Finalist	America's Got Talent (season 18)	Semi-Finalist	Shadow Ace then showcased his extraordinary talent again during the audition round of the eighteenth season of America's Got Talent. His act resonated with the audience, garnering enough votes to progress to the subsequent round of the competition. Despite his incredible skill and appeal, Shadow Ace concluded his journey as a semi-finalist, securing an impressive third place in the fourth round of the qualifiers round.
Philip Galit (Shadow Ace)	Shadow play	Season 5 Semi-Finalist	America's Got Talent: Fantasy League	Top 10; Finalist	Shadow Ace also competed on America's Got Talent: Fantasy League, the fourth spin-off of America's Got Talent. He was assigned to Howie Mandel's team. He surprised everyone in the auditions when he turned Howie's bald head into a drum and then a dance floor during Nelly's "Hot in Herre," before finally playing his head like a piano during Vanessa Carlton's "A Thousand Miles."; In the finals, he ramped up the comedy in his Finals performance with a little help from Judge Heidi Klum: she hilariously served as Shadow Ace's assistant during the shadow puppetry Act, which had an eager shadow puppet trying to woo the supermodel amid the backdrop of musical classics like Kelis’ “Milkshake”, Boyz II Men's “I’ll Make Love to You” and even Klum's own hit “Chai Tea with Heidi.” He finished as a Top 10 finalist.
Power Duo	Contemporary dance duo	Season 5 Winner	Asia's Got Talent (season 3)	Third Place	The couple participated in the third season of Asia's Got Talent where they danced to Fight Song by Rachel Platten. They eventually garnered enough votes to proceed to the next round, and they were selected for the semi-finals, where they performed a dance routine to the tune of "Say Something" by A Great Big World and Christina Aguilera. The duo eventually finished in third place.
Power Duo	Contemporary dance duo	Season 5 Winner	America's Got Talent: All-Stars	Grand Finalist (Top 5)	The couple also participated in America's Got Talent: All-Stars where they showcased their talents. During their audition, the duo performed a mesmerizing dance routine to the duet rendition of "You Are the Reason" by Calum Scott featuring Leona Lewis. Their captivating performance earned them enough votes to advance to the qualifiers. In the finals, the duo delivered a breathtaking performance to “In The Stars” by Benson Boone. Their routine included stunning floor and aerial maneuvers, featuring a ceiling installation that propelled them into the air for remarkable acrobatic stunts. The climax of their act was Anjanette releasing the aerial ribbon mid-air and gracefully falling straight into Jervin's waiting arms. For their second performance, the duo danced to the song “Crystallize” alongside the American violinist and former America's Got Talent alumna, Lindsey Stirling.
The Velasco Brothers	Breakdancing duo	Season 1 Third Place	Asia's Got Talent (season 1)	Semi-Finalist	The Velasco Brothers auditioned in the first season of Asia's Got Talent, and garnered enough votes to proceed to the next round. They were selected to perform in the semi-finals, where they were eventually eliminated at the first semi-final round after failing to secure votes enough to be in the Top Two.

=== Local appearances ===
Pilipinas Got Talent has seen one act that have joined on any local singing or dance competition after their appearance on the show.

List of Pilipinas Got Talent contestants that auditioned on local competitions
Contestant	Act	Original season	Show/s participated	Status	Notes
Nocturnal Dance Company	Hip-hop dance group	Season 6; 6th place	Battle of the Judges	Eliminated (in Battle to the Top)	The group joined on Battle of the Judges, a spin-off of the Got Talent franchise. Assigned to Boy Abunda's team, the group won the first round (Battle of the Best) of the battle against Annette Gozon-Valdes' group, Shadow Arts Theater after garnering two votes (from Bea Alonzo and the studio audience). The group then proceeded to the second round of the competition (Battle to the Top) where the group lost their battle against Alonzo's participant, Joseph Erwin Valerio. The group had only received a vote from Jose Manalo. The group failed to secure one more vote to proceed to the next round.
Nocturnal Dance Company	Hip-hop dance group	Season 6; 6th place	It's Showdown	Eliminated (Daily Rounds)	The group also joined It's Showdown, a dance competition segment of It's Showtime. During the first round named "Hatawan-on-One", Dion was their representative, in which she had a showdown with Ninja Shogun, Ruthless Comrades' representative. The group only received 3 points out of the other groups' 4 points. Next, during the second round named "Dance Showdown" where the groups perform, both groups had a score of 3.7 points, but was short enough to win the daily rounds and to proceed to the weekly finals, with the group only receiving 6.7 points out of the other groups' 7.7 points. Ruthless Comrades later auditioned for the seventh season but were not selected for the live shows.

== Controversies and criticisms ==
=== "A Susan Boyle in the making" ===
During the first season, Antonio J. Montalvan II of Philippine Daily Inquirer lamented about how auditions, particularly during the ones held in the southern island of Mindanao, reflect the Philippine showbiz culture of denigrating people from outside Metro Manila, who are often referred as "promdi." The writer spoke of a male contestant from Davao City, whom he called "a Susan Boyle in the making," but the audience applause was cut short after judge Kris Aquino "wryly commented that to appreciate the contestant’s voice, one should not look at his face but only listen to his voice."

=== Public's preference for singers ===
After 13 year-old singer Roel Manlangit was declared the winner of the fourth season, many Filipino netizens were disappointed with the show for its preference with singers. The show had produced four singers for four straight seasons, all of whom were males. Many had vented their disappointments on Twitter. One shared that in order to win the show, one must be a male singer with a very sad and tragic background story. Some netizens also recommended to change the title of the show to "Pilipinas Got Singers" and "Pilipinas Got Awa" (Philippines Got Mercy) pertaining much to the winning streak of singers in the show.

=== South Korean forced to speak Tagalog ===
In the sixth season of the show, Robin Padilla drew flak from the netizens for "forcing" a South Korean contestant to speak in Tagalog. In an episode aired on January 13, 2018, Kim Ji-wan, a South Korean who has been living in the Philippines for ten years, asked Robin Padilla to help him with his card trick. Padilla declined, stating that the Korean should speak in Tagalog. "Iho, Pilipinas Got Talent. Mag-Tagalog ka kasi magmumukha kaming katawa-tawa kung mag-i-English kami dito para sa'yo. Pilipinas Got Talent. Mag-Tagalog ka, iho." (Son, this is Pilipinas Got Talent. Speak in Tagalog because we will become a laughingstock if we speak in English just for you. This is Pilipinas Got Talent. Speak in Tagalog.)

Viewers quickly turned to social media sites, stating that Padilla's attitude towards the Korean contestant was rude and racist. After being criticized by the netizens, the judge did not express any remorse for his actions. He continued to comment on his Instagram account, with a middle finger emoji, saying, “Ako pa ba ang dapat magadjust sa isang dayuhan na 10 taon na sa Pilipinas? Naku hindi po mangyayari! Never!” (Am I supposed to adjust to a foreigner who has been living for 10 years in the Philippines? That won't happen!).

=== Objectification of women ===
In the sixth season of the show, the Playgirls, a four-member girl group, washed a car while gyrating and twerking in their underwear. Angel Locsin pressed her buzzer a few seconds into the performance, later explaining that she did not want men to objectify the Playgirls: "Kaya ko kayo binuzz, ayaw kong ma-objectify kayo. Masyado ako nagmamalasakit para sa inyo para i-go ko 'to at patuloy kayong panoorin ng mga kalalakihan na ginagawa iyan" ("I buzzed you because I don't want you to be objectified. I care too much for you to allow you to be watched by men while you're doing that"). Robin Padilla then asked the Playgirls to clarify if the sultry performance was indeed their choice and if they enjoyed what they did, to which they replied "yes". Padilla then added: "Gusto niyo ba 'yun na mga kalalakihan ay humahanga sa inyo?" ("Do you like it that men admire you?"), to which Locsin protested: "Seryoso ka?" ("Are you serious?"). Padilla then explained that he wanted to hear the performers' viewpoint, wherein they stood by their earlier performance. Padilla then acknowledged Locsin's statements, telling the Playgirls that Locsin—a women's rights advocate—intended to protect them. Padilla then apologized to Locsin.

The Playgirls' performance and the exchange between Padilla and Locsin sparked online discussions about the sexualization and objectification of women. Some netizens agreed with Locsin's position, while others interpreted her opinion as slut-shaming. The Playgirls themselves criticized Locsin on their own Facebook pages after the incident, pointing out her bikini costume when she played Darna back in 2005. Meanwhile, the Gabriela Women's Party commended Locsin "for her firm stance against the objectification of women".

=== Robin Padilla's sexist remarks ===
In the sixth season, Robin Padilla was criticized multiple times for his sexist and misogynistic remarks against 32 year-old spiral pole dancer and eventual season winner Kristel de Catalina.

==== Semi-finals ====
During the semifinals, Robin Padilla was severely criticized by the viewers for his unsolicited comment to Kristel de Catalina. During the second week of live semifinals aired on April 1, 2018, Kristel de Catalina, a single mom, performed a spiral pole dance act that received a standing ovation from the judges and the audience. Angel Locsin was the first to comment, stating, "Ikaw ang pinakamabigat na makakalaban ng contestants ng PGT. Kailangan talaga nila mag-level up para makatapat sayo. Sobrang wow." (You are the toughest contestant to beat in PGT. They really need to level up. You are overwhelming.) Locsin was followed by Robin Padilla. "Umpisa pa lang solb na ko sayo eh. Alam mo, 'di ako natakot sa lahat ng ginawa mo. Wala akong naramdamang takot kasi alam kong kayang kaya mo. Perfect yung [form] mo; precision." (I’ve liked [your performance] from the start. I wasn't scared at all by everything you did, because I know you can really do it. Your form is perfect; you've got precision.) The last to comment was Vice Ganda. "Tapos na?" (It's over already?), he asked jokingly. "Tapos na, 'di ba? Thank you so much because you saved the night. Wala. Lampaso yung kalaban. Nilampaso mo yung kalaban." (It's over, right? Thank you so much because you saved the night. You've swept away the competition and your competitors.) Vice Ganda also added, "Lalong nagpaganda pa 'yung simbolismo nung ginagawa mo, 'yung simbolismo na ginagawa mo na pinapakita mo sa buong mundo na ikaw ay isang solo parent. Ikaw ay isang babae at ang isang babae ay kayang umangat at magningning kahit nag-iisa." (The symbolism of what you did all the more made things beautiful, how you are showing the whole world that you are a single parent. You are a woman, and a woman can rise above and shine although alone.) It was at this point when Robin Padilla suddenly spoke to the microphone, exclaiming, "Pero kailangan mo pa rin ng lalaki!" (But you still need a man!) Vice Ganda immediately clarified, pointing to Padilla, "Para sa kanya 'yon. Para kay Robin 'yon." (That's for him. That's for Robin.)

The viewers turned again to social media quickly, calling out Padilla for his sexist and misogynistic remark.

==== Grand Finals ====
Padilla was once again under fire by netizens for his sexist and misogynistic comment made after Kristel de Catalina's grand final performance on April 28, 2018. Padilla commented first, saying, "Kristel, alam mo, 'yung mga ginagawa mo delikado, pero gusto kong malaman mo na kahit isang beses hindi ako ninerbiyos dahil alam ko napakagaling mo, napakahusay mo." (Kristel, you know, what you're doing is dangerous, but I want you to know that no matter how many times I watch you perform, I don't get nervous, because I know that you are so great, you are so talented.) "Gusto ko lang malaman mo na gustong gusto ko na meron sa'yong nag-a-assist sa'yo na lalaki ngayon. Isang malaking bagay na makita ko ang assistant mo may lalaki diyan sa baba, hindi man katabi mo pero assistant mo," Padilla added. (I just want you to know that I really like it that there's a guy assisting you now. It's a huge thing for me to see that you have a male assistant there below; he may not be next to you, but he's still your assistant.)

As usual, the viewers slammed the judge through social media sites. One Twitter user called him out for tagging women as "individuals who cannot live without men".

== Awards ==
Year	Awards	Nominated	Result	Ref.
2014	2014 Golden Screen TV Awards by Entertainment Press Society Inc.	Luis Manzano as Outstanding Reality/Competition Program Host	Won	
2014	2014 Golden Screen TV Awards by Entertainment Press Society Inc.	Billy Crawford as Outstanding Reality/Competition Program Host	Nominated	
2014	2014 Golden Screen TV Awards by Entertainment Press Society Inc.	Pilipinas Got Talent as Outstanding Adapted Reality/Competition Program	Nominated	
2014	1st PUP Mabini Media Awards; Polytechnic University of the Philippines	Pilipinas Got Talent as Best Television Reality Program	Won	
2013	11th Gawad Tanglaw by Tagapuring mga Akademisyan ng Aninong Gumagalaw	Pilipinas Got Talent for Best Talent Search Program	Won	
2013	2013 Golden Screen TV Awards by Entertainment Press Society Inc.	Pilipinas Got Talent as Outstanding Adapted Reality/Competition Program	Nominated	
2013	2013 Golden Screen TV Awards by Entertainment Press Society Inc.	Luis Manzano, Billy Crawford as Outstanding Reality/Competition Program Host	Won	
2012	26th PMPC Star Awards for Television by Philippine Movie Press Club	Luis Manzano, Billy Crawford as Best Talent Search Program Host	Won	
2012	2012 Yahoo! OMG! Awards by Yahoo! Philippines	Luis Manzano as Male TV Host	Won	
2012	3rd Students’ Choice Awards for Radio and Television by Northwest Samar State University	Pilipinas Got Talent as Best Reality Show	Won	
2012	3rd Students’ Choice Awards for Radio and Television by Northwest Samar State University	Luis Manzano as Best Reality Show Host	Won	
2011	25th PMPC Star Awards for Television by Philippine Movie Press Club	Luis Manzano, Billy Crawford as Best Talent Search Program Host	Won	
2011	2011 Yahoo! OMG! Awards by Yahoo! Philippines	Luis Manzano as Male TV Host	Won	
2011	2011 Golden Screen TV Awards by Entertainment Press Society Inc.	Pilipinas Got Talent as Outstanding Adapted Reality/Competition Program	Nominated	
2011	2011 Golden Screen TV Awards by Entertainment Press Society Inc.	Luis Manzano, Billy Crawford as Outstanding Reality/Competition Program Host	Won	
2010	24th PMPC Star Awards for Television by Philippine Movie Press Club	Luis Manzano, Billy Crawford as Best Talent Search Program Host	Won	
2010	2010 Anak TV Seal Award by Anak TV, Inc.	Pilipinas Got Talent for Anak TV Seal Award for TV Programs	Won	
