= Maasinhon Trio =

Filipino musical group

- Origin: Southern Leyte, Philippines
- Genres: OPM
- Years active: 2011–2021
- Past members: Andrew Sanchez; Licinio Lolo; Bonifacio Salubre

Maasinhon Trio was a musical group in the Philippines, known for being the grand winner in the third season of the Philippine Got Talent franchise.

== Background ==
The Maasinhon Trio is a group from Southern Leyte in the Philippines and is composed by Andrew Sanchez, Licinio Lolo and Bonifacio Salubre.

Prior to winning Pilipinas Got Talent, they performed at weddings, birthdays and other occasions, all while taking day jobs: Lolo works with the provincial government, Sanchez is a warehouse chief in the Southern Leyte Electric Cooperative and Salubre is a fire officer.

The trio, who also earned the distinction of being the oldest grand winner for Pilipinas Got Talent, garnered 22.59% of the total text and online votes and took home the grand prize of ₱2 million.

== Reception ==
On performance night of the Pilipinas Got Talent, the trio earned acclaim from judges Ai-Ai delas Alas, Kris Aquino, ABS-CBN former president Freddie M. Garcia and the crowd with their version of "Nais Ko" by Basil Valdez. The trio was also compared to APO Hiking Society, a veteran Filipino musical group composed of Jim Paredes, Danny Javier and Boboy Garovillo owing to their good rendition of the songs they perform.

Maasinhon's win caused some controversy, however. According to Karen Valeza of Yahoo! News, "The trio drew the ire of viewers as favorites El Gamma Penumbra from Tanauan City, Batangas, Synergy of Negros Occidental, and Muriel Lomadilla of Cebu City did not even reach the final three. These viewers thought [the trio] pale[s] in comparison to these performers." In a report, the audience of the Pilipinas Got Talent at the time expressed dissatisfaction over the results. Nevertheless, in a live interview on The Buzz, the trio stated they are respecting other people's opinion.

== See also ==
- Pilipinas Got Talent (season 3)
- Jovit Baldivino
- Marcelito Pomoy
- Khalil Ramos
- Markki Stroem

Awards and achievements
| Preceded by Marcelito Pomoy | Pilipinas Got Talent; 2011 (season 3) | Succeeded by Roel Manlangit |
