= Marcelito Pomoy =

Filipino singer

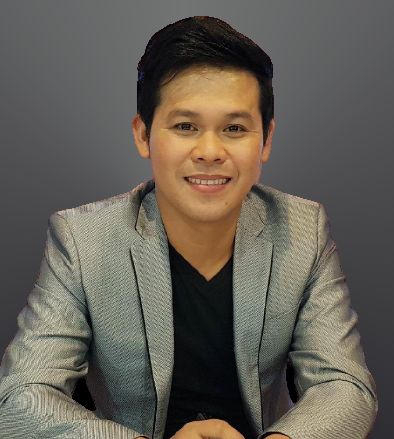

Background information
- Also known as: Mars Dual
- Born: Marcelito Castro Pomoy; September 22, 1984 (age 42); Imus, Cavite, Philippines
- Origin: Bislig, Surigao del Sur, Philippines
- Genres: P-pop, soul, classical
- Occupations: Singer, businessman
- Instruments: Vocals
- Years active: 2011–present
- Labels: Star Records (2011–2015); Star Magic (2011–2015)

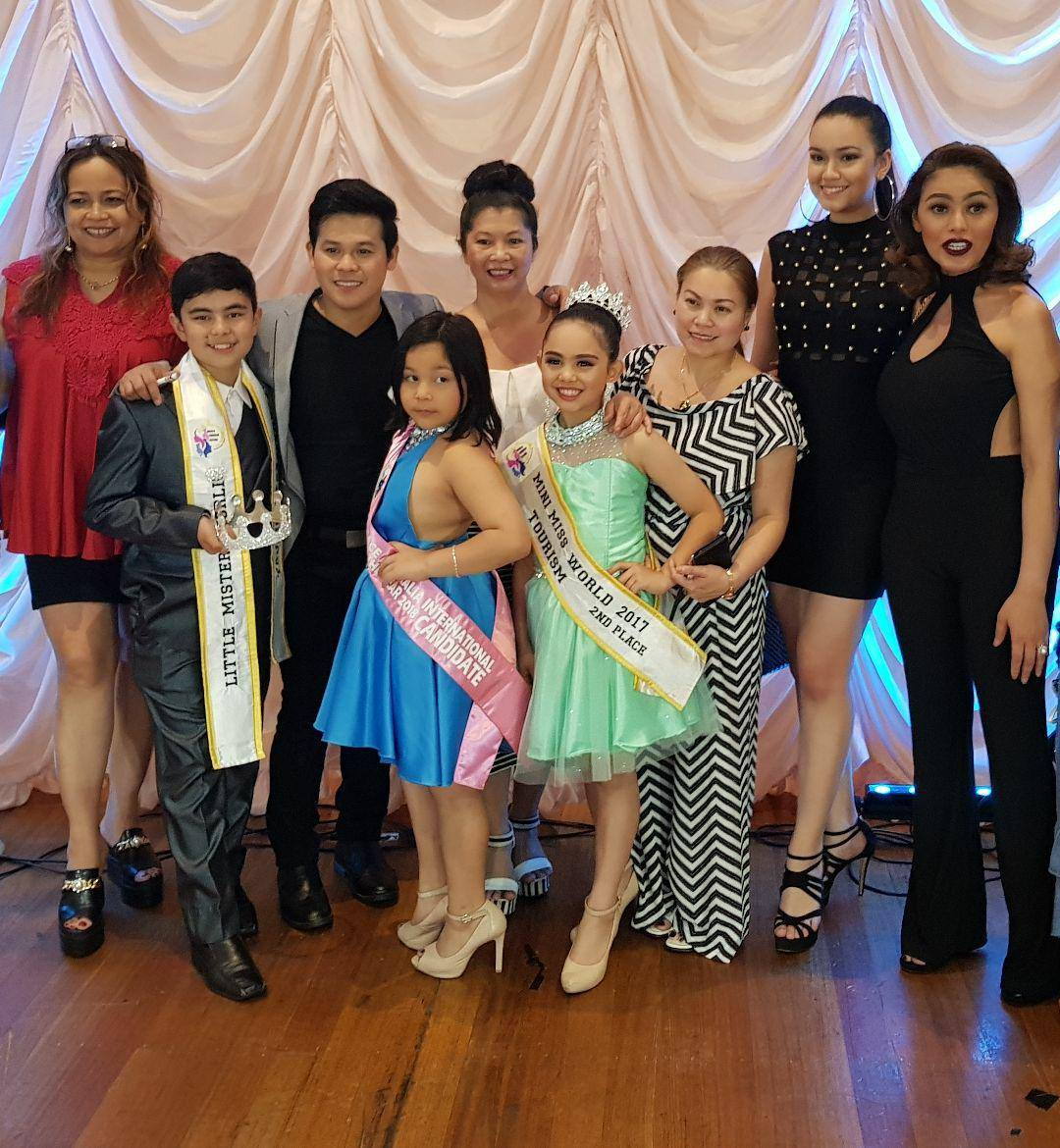
Marcelito Pomoy in concert by The Face Australia Promotions & Management with its Director Choy Symes

Marcelito "Mars" Castro Pomoy (born September 22, 1984) is a Filipino singer, known for his ability to sing in both baritone and mezzo-soprano. He is the grand winner of the second season of Pilipinas Got Talent. In 2019, he took part in America's Got Talent: The Champions finishing fourth overall.

== Early life and career ==
Pomoy was born in Imus, Cavite and raised in Bislig, Surigao del Sur, both of which are in the Philippines.

When he was young, his father was incarcerated while his mother left him alone with his younger sibling and went to Manila. He was later adopted by a police officer and did odd jobs when he was a teenager. Later on, both his biological father and mother had separate families of their own.

Pomoy had discovered a talent of his while doing poultry work: singing in both a male tenor voice and a strikingly convincing female soprano voice. This paved the way for him to join different contests in both the amateur and professional leagues, including Talentadong Pinoy.

He later joined the second season of Pilipinas Got Talent (PGT), when he was 26 years old and by this time, made the cut. In the course of his PGT stint, he was able to fulfill his lifelong dream to reunite with his family.

Pomoy makes regular appearances on ASAP, and his first studio album, entitled Duet Yourself, was released in 2011 under Star Records.

== America's Got Talent: The Champions ==
Pomoy's success on PGT led to his being a contestant on the second season of America's Got Talent: The Champions. He auditioned with "The Prayer" in episode 2 that aired January 13, 2020. He finished fourth in the competition overall.

== Personal life ==
On September 21, 2014, one day before his 40th birthday, Pomoy married Joan Paraiso of Calauag, Quezon. They have two daughters, Marcella Janiah (MJ), and Marchesa Janoah (MC). Pomoy currently resides in his wife's hometown in Calauag together with his family.

== Philanthropist ==
Pomoy, who has hardware stores in Calauag, does philanthropic activities in town. He has built small houses for some residents and helps organize donation drives for education and other sectors.

== Discography ==
=== Studio albums ===
Album	Tracks	Year	Label
Duet Yourself	"The Prayer" (original/minus one/instrumental) "Hanggang Ngayon" (original/minus one/instrumental) "Let the Love Begin" (original/minus one/instrumental) "Bakit Ngayon Ka Lang?" (original/minus one/instrumental) "Forever" (original/minus one/instrumental)	2011	Star Records
Split	"Hanggang Kailan" "Pagmamahal" "Panandalian" "Pa'no Kaya?" "Hanggang Ngayon" "The Prayer" "Ikaw ang Buhay Ko" "What is love?"	2013	Star Records

== Filmography ==
=== Television ===
TV Show	TV Network	Role	Year
Pilipinas Got Talent (season 2)	ABS-CBN	Contestant/Grand Winner	2011
ASAP	ABS-CBN	Singer/host	2011–present
Gandang Gabi, Vice!	ABS-CBN	Guest	2011
Kris TV	ABS-CBN	Guest	2011
Wowowin	GMA	Contestant	2018
The Ellen DeGeneres Show	NBC	Guest	2018
ASOP Music Festival	UNTV	Interpreter	2018
America's Got Talent: The Champions (season 2)	NBC	Contestant	2020
Gandang Gabi, Vice!	ABS-CBN	Guest	2020
Kesayasaya	Net 25	Eat Sing Time	2021

== See also ==
- Pilipinas Got Talent (season 2)
- America's Got Talent: The Champions (season 2)
- Jovit Baldivino
- Maasinhon Trio
- Power Duo
- Kristel de Catalina

Awards and achievements
Preceded by Jovit Baldivino	Pilipinas Got Talent; 2011 (season 2)	Succeeded by Maasinhon Trio
