= El Gamma Penumbra =

Filipino shadow play group

- Type: Theatre group
- Location: Tanauan, Batangas, Philippines
- Members: 27 members (21 seniors; 6 juniors)
- Artistic director(s): Marvin Marfa and Marck Patrick Suarez
- Website: Official website

El Gamma Penumbra is a Filipino all male shadow play group, best known for being the winners of the first season of Asia's Got Talent.

== Etymology ==
Gamma refers to gamma rays and Penumbra means “shadow”, so its name describes "the ray of light (behind) a man's shadow".

== History ==
=== Early career ===
El Gamma Penumbra was first founded in 2008 as a hip-hop boy group, competing in dance contests in Tanauan, their home town in the province of Batangas, in southwest Luzon (about a one-hour drive from Manila). The group decided to change their act prior to Pilipinas Got Talent, thinking that they would be less likely to win as there has been too many hip-hop dance groups in the Philippines. Upon deciding to do shadow play, believing it is new and unique, they started practicing in a basketball court near Tanauan, using a tarpaulin and a halogen light as an improvisation. The group is composed solely of male members, citing "extreme body movements and contact required of their routines."

=== Pilipinas Got Talent ===
Before winning in the first season of Asia's Got Talent, El Gamma Penumbra once joined the Philippine version of the franchise last 2011. The shadow play group automatically advanced to the grand finals after receiving the highest nationwide votes from their semi-finals performance. They were the first one to get to the grand finals. The group then performed a tourism-inspired shadow play, advocating the tourist spots in the Philippines, during their grand finals performance held on October 23, 2011, at the Ynares Sports Center in Antipolo. They eventually garnered the fourth spot after receiving 8.05% of the votes.

Since then, they were usually invited to perform as guest stars in various places and shows. In particular, they became regular guests in It's Showtime, performing acts such as a tribute to Overseas Filipino Workers (OFWs) who are unable to spend Christmas with their families in the Philippines, a tribute to the death anniversary of the late former senator Benigno Aquino Jr., and an inspirational number about hope and faith performed during the Holy Week.

=== Asia's Got Talent ===
On September 28, 2014, El Gamma Penumbra pre-auditioned at the SMX Convention Center, SM Mall of Asia for the upcoming first Asia's Got Talent to be held in Singapore. They advanced to the televised audition held at the Pinewood Iskandar Malaysia Studios in Johor, Malaysia, wherein they were almost not able to join because of a conflict in their schedule. They chose to perform during Pope Francis's visit to the Philippines first, which was already scheduled beforehand, and was still able to fly to Malaysia for the taping. Among their 27 members, only 13 were selected to compete due to budget constraints. They eventually advanced to the semifinals night after receiving a golden buzzer by Indonesian artist Anggun, while Taiwanese singer Vanness Wu complimented: "I loved how you guys told the stories beautifully and it was just so wonderful to see live and up close. Thank you so much for that great job."

During the franchise's semifinals night, the shadow play group performed a routine based centrally on war, recovery from war, and peace to Matisyahu's "One Day". Their performance, aired on April 30, earned them another golden buzzer from the four judges, enabling them to take a spot in the grand finals automatically. They were the only Filipino act among the four to receive both golden buzzers. Canadian musician and record producer David Foster said: "I just want to say that I live in a box, where I make music in a studio. And tonight, I got to come outside of my box and see something that was so, so moving and magical. It just amazed me."

Before announcing the winner of Asia's Got Talent season 1 aired on May 7, the remaining nine contestants performed their own pieces at the Marina Bay Sands. With "Colors of the Wind" from Disney's animated film Pocahontas as the background song, El Gamma Penumbra performed a shadow play that incorporates global issues in hopes to share a message to save Mother Nature. The next week, on May 14, the second part of the grand finals night was aired, announcing El Gamma Penumbra as the overall winner based on public votes.

The group was the first to win in Asia's Got Talent reality TV show. The group received US$100,000 for their prize money, as well as an opportunity to perform at Marina Bay Sands in Singapore. The group leader's exclaimed: "Asia's Got Talent is the highlight of our careers and of our lives." They were then given a heroes' parade in their hometown of Tanauan, province of Batangas, who welcomed them in their return from said contest.

== Artistry ==
El Gamma Penumbra was chosen to be a part of the Philippine tourism campaign 'Choose Philippines'. Due to their ability to be able to deliver a message through their shadow acts, they were chosen in hopes to strengthen the campaign's mission in promoting the Philippines. During their stay in Asia's Got Talent season 1, the four judges had always been commenting about El Gamma Penumbra's message-filled performances. Particularly, Indonesian judge Anggun mentioned: "Our job as entertainers, if you can raise awareness on important issues, like Mother Nature and animals, that will make our job more noble," after their last performance in the show. After winning, Negrense artist Charlie Co cited El Gamma Penumbra as a group who inspired people all around the world to contribute to the society's welfare through their talents and art.

In an interview, El Gamma Penumbra admitted that it was always been a challenge to think of a fresh and meaningful concept for their next performance saying: "It's really hard because we have different cultures and we have to touch their hearts. So, we have to think of concepts that are universal so that everyone will understand." They are also devoted in exhibiting their performances well that their practices usually left them sleep deprived. According to the group's creative head, Marvin Marfa, they dedicated their 22 hours to rehearse and used the remaining two hours for sleeping in the dance studio during Asia's Got Talent.
