= Alice (South Korean group) =

South Korean girl group

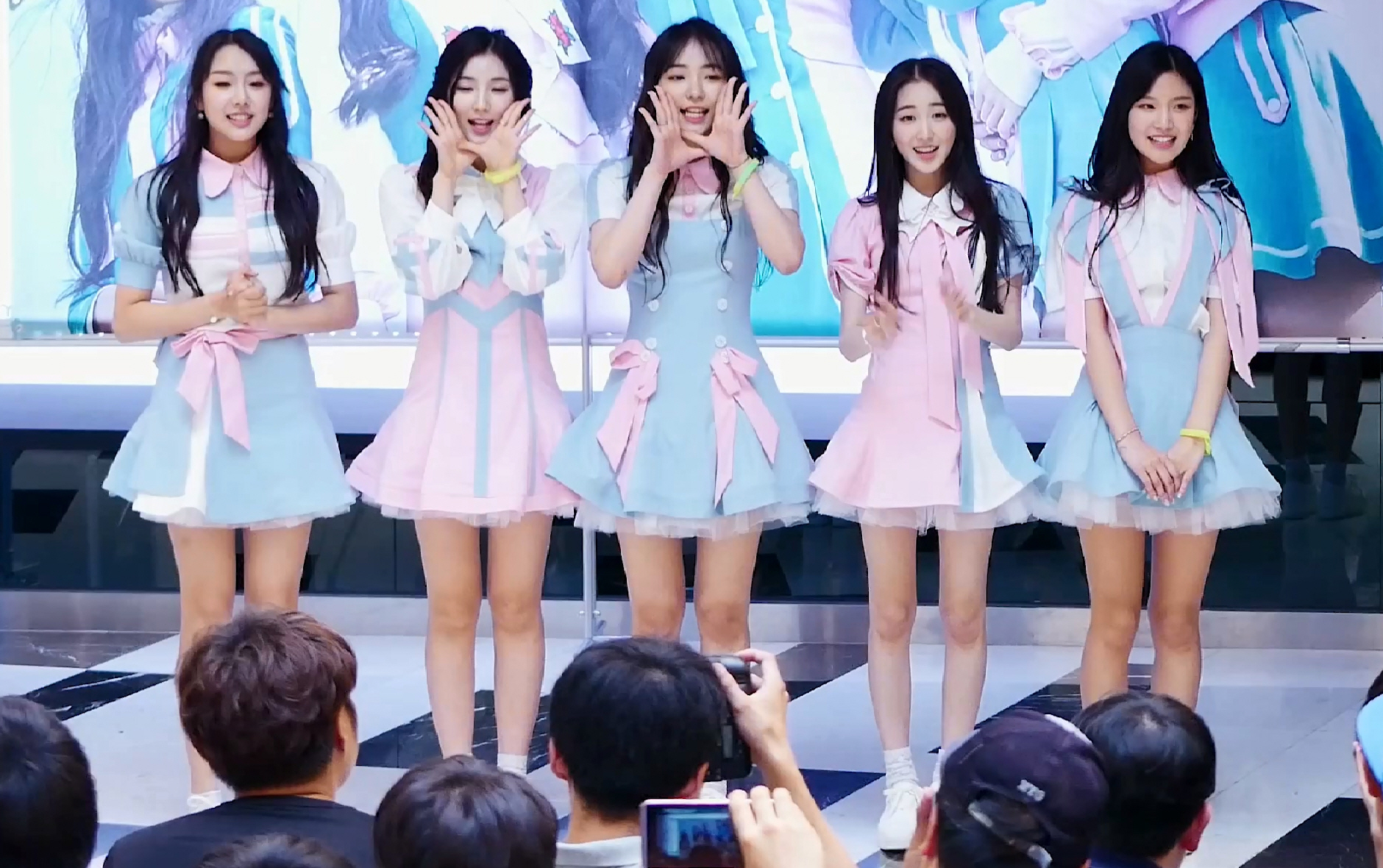
- Alice in 2017; From left to right: Karin, Sohee, Yeonje, Yukyung, and Do-A.

Background information
- Origin: Seongnam, South Korea
- Genres: K-pop; dance
- Years active: 2017–2024
- Labels: Hunus; IOK Company
- Past members: Sohee; Do-A; Yukyung; Yeonje; Karin; EJ; Chaejeong

Alice (Korean: 앨리스; formerly known as Elris), was a South Korean girl group originally consisting of members Karin, Sohee, Yeonje, Yukyung, and Do-A. The group originally debuted as Elris on June 1, 2017, with their first extended play, We, First. Member Sohee retired from the music industry on April 26, 2024, while members Karin, Do-A, Yukyung, and Yeonje left on May 2–3, 2024. They ended their activities following their last single Milky Way.

In December 2021, the group was transferred to IOK Company and later re-branding as Alice in April 2022.

== History ==
=== Pre-debut ===
Prior to the group's debut, Chaejeong debuted as a member of the co-ed kids group "Uniteen" in 2010. The group later disbanded the same year.

Kim So-hee and Min Ka-rin were contestants on the reality show K-pop Star 6. Sohee was part of the KWIN unit, which made it to the final episode as the runner-up.

Following the conclusion of K-pop Star 6, on May 19, 2017, Sohee released her first solo digital single "Spotlight".

=== 2017–2020: Debut as Elris and re-formation as seven members ===
On June 1, 2017, Elris released their first EP, We, First, containing five tracks including the titular lead single.

Their second EP, Color Crush, was released on September 13, 2017, consisting of five other tracks and the lead single "Pow Pow".

In late 2017, members Bella and Hyeseong participated in the reality show MIXNINE. Both of them did not make it to the final lineup of the female winners.

On June 6, 2018, Hunus Entertainment confirmed that Elris would be coming back on June 28 with their third EP titled Summer Dream. On June 28, Elris released their third mini-album, containing three tracks, including the titular title song.

On October 18, 2018, Sohee debuted as a soloist, with the digital single "Hurry Up".

On November 12, 2019, Elris released a digital single titled Miss U.

On February 12, 2020, Hunus Entertainment confirmed the addition of two new members, EJ and Chaejeong. On February 26, the group released their fourth extended play Jackpot, including a single of the same name. This was their first release as a seven-member group following the addition of two new members and their first proper comeback in nearly two years since their third mini album. Jackpot was also the last release that carried the name ELRIS. The group went on hiatus for most of 2020 and all of 2021.

=== 2021–2024: New agency, rebranding, Sohee’s retirement, members departure, and activity end ===
On December 1, 2021, it was announced that Elris would be transferred to IOK Company.

On April 11, 2022, it was announced that the group rebranded to Alice. Members Hyeseong and Bella changed their stage names to Yeonje and Do-A, respectively. Chaejeong was also appointed as the new leader. They were scheduled to make their comeback in May 3 with the digital single "Power of Love". However, it was announced that the digital single's release would be delayed to May 4. On October 4, 2022, it was announced that Alice would come back with "Dance On" as a single; the song was released on October 27, 2022.

On April 19, 2023, Alice released their second single album Show Down. In addition, a representative from the agency IOK Company stated, “Alice members Do-A and Yeonje are temporarily halting their activities due to recent health issues and are currently resting and recovering. This comeback featured five members. On April 26, 2024, Sohee retired from being an idol after marrying her boyfriend. On May 2, 2024, Do-A made an Instagram post saying that she left ALICE after her contract expired. On May 3, 2024, Yukyung, Yeonje, and Karin made Instagram stories and went on Bubble saying that they left ALICE after their contracts expired.

Alice released their last single as a group on May 13, 2024 with the song "Milky Way."

== Past members ==
- Sohee (소희) — vocalist
- Do-A (도아) — rapper, vocalist
- Yukyung (유경) — dancer, vocalist
- Karin (가린) — vocalist
- Yeonje (연제) — dancer, vocalist
- EJ (이제이) — rapper
- Chaejeong (채정) — leader

== Discography ==
=== Extended plays ===
Title	Album details	Peak chart positions	Sales
Title	Album details	KOR	Sales
Elris
We, First	Released: June 1, 2017; Label: Hunus Entertainment, LOEN Entertainment; Formats: CD, digital download; Track listing: 1. Searching for Elris (Intro); 2. We, First (우리 처음); 3. My Star (나의 별); 4. Miracle; 5. You And I (너와 나)	21	KOR: 4,344
Color Crush	Released: September 13, 2017; Label: Hunus Entertainment, LOEN Entertainment; Formats: CD, digital download; Track Listing: 1. Heart Bank; 2. Pow Pow; 3. Roopretelcham (열려라 그대); 4. Wonderland Girl; 5. Farewell (짝이별) (feat. A-Tom); 6. Midnight, Moonlight	15	KOR: 6,463
Summer Dream	Released: June 28, 2018; Label: Hunus Entertainment, Kakao M; Formats: CD, digital download; Track Listing: 1. Summer Dream; 2. Will Be Mine (찰랑찰랑); 3. Talk To Me (말해) (Prod. Ravi); 4. Lovely (챙겨주고 싶어); 5. Focus	15	KOR: 5,927
Jackpot	Released: February 26, 2020; Label: Hunus Entertainment, Kakao M; Formats: CD, digital download; Track Listing: 1. Intro; 2. Jackpot; 3. This Is Me; 4. Like I Do (해봐); 5. No Big Deal	19	KOR: 3,880

=== Single albums ===
Title	Album details	Peak chart positions	Sales
Title	Album details	KOR	Sales
Alice
Dance On	Released: October 27, 2022; Label: IOK Company, Kakao Entertainment; Formats: CD, digital download; Track listing: 1. Lavish Light; 2. Dance On	67	KOR: 2,928
Show Down	Released: April 19, 2023; Label: IOK Company, Kakao Entertainment; Formats: CD, digital download; Track Listing: 1. Show Down; 2. Dizzy	70	KOR: 2,824

=== Singles ===
Title	Year	Peak chart positions	Album
Title	Year	KOR Down.	Album
Elris
"We, First" (우리 처음)	2017	—	We, First
"Pow Pow"	2017	—	Color Crush
"Summer Dream"	2018	—	Summer Dream
"Miss U" (그립다)	2019	—	Non-album single
"Jackpot"	2020	—	Jackpot
Alice
"Power of Love" (내 안의 우주)	2022	—	Non-album single
"Dance On"	2022	86	Dance On
"Show Down"	2023	105	Show Down
"Milky Way"	2024	—	Non-album singles
"—" denotes releases that did not chart or were not released in that region.

=== OSTs ===
Title	Year	Album
Elris
"Cotton Candy" (솜사탕)	2019	I Hate You Juliet OST Part.2

=== Compilation appearances ===
Title	Year	Album
Elris
"White Love" (스키장에서)	2020	Immortal Songs: Singing the Legend (Kim Jong-guk x Turbo Part 1)

== Concerts and tours ==
=== Concert participation ===
Title	Date	Venue	Network
Elris
Beyond LIVE - 2020 K-Pop x K-Art Concert Super KPA	November 27, 2020	N/A	Naver V Live
Alice
Begin Again - K-Pop Edition	May 29, 2022	Smart Araneta Coliseum	-
Seen Festival in Kuala Lumpur 2023	January 28, 2023	Axiata Arena, Bukit Jalil	-

== Awards and nominations ==
Year	Award	Category	Nominated Work	Result
2018	24th Korean Entertainment Arts Awards	Best Rookie Group (Female)	Elris	Won
