= Kriesha Chu =

Filipino–American singer (born 1998)

Kriesha
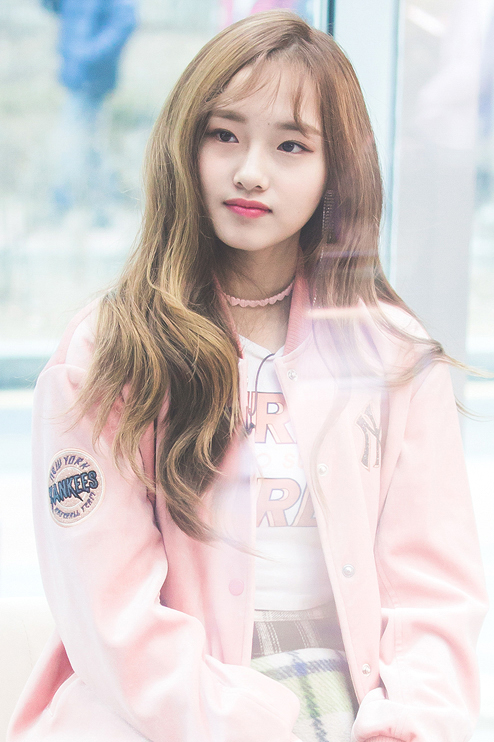
- Chu in 2018.
- Born: Kriesha Ziskind Teo Tiu; December 20, 1998 (age 27); Makati, Philippines
- Occupations: Singer; actress
- Musical career
- Genres: K-pop
- Instrument: Vocals
- Years active: 2016–present
- Labels: Urban Works Media; Star Music; New Way Company

Signature
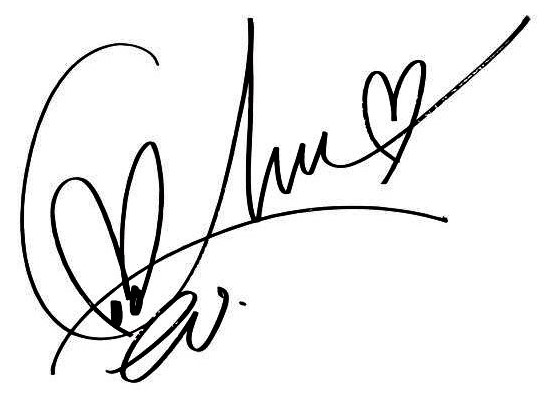

Kriesha Ziskind Teo Tiu (born December 20, 1998), known mononymously as Kriesha (Korean: 크리샤), is a Filipino-American singer based in South Korea.

== Life and career ==
=== Early life ===
Kriesha Ziskind Teo Tiu was born on December 20, 1998, in Makati, Philippines to Filipino parents of Chinese heritage who relocated from Cebu to Manila. At the age of 2, Tiu migrated with her family to San Francisco. She speaks Cebuano.

=== 2016–2017: K-pop Star 6: The Last Chance and Kriesha Chu 1st Single Album ===
In 2016, Chu entered K-pop Star 6: The Last Chance. She was eliminated on the seventh episode, but was brought back as a wild card contestant. She became a member of Kwins, which consists of Kim So-hee and Kim Hye-rim, where they finished as runners-up of the competition. After K-pop Star 6 ended, Chu released her first single album on May 24, 2017.

=== 2018–present: Dream of Paradise and soundtrack appearances ===
On January 3, 2018, she released her first mini-album, Dream of Paradise, along with the title track "Like Paradise". The lead single is composed by the harmony team of Pentagon's Hui and Flow Blow. "Sunset Dream" is composed by Denis Seo, Sophia Pae, and Chu herself. She also contributed as a lyricist for both Korean and English versions. "Falling Star" is a collaboration project by Chu and Kim Min-ju, an Urban Works Entertainment trainee who later became a member of the Korean-Japanese project girl group Iz*One. This is her first highlight project unit with a fellow company trainee entitled Project Diary. In September, Chu also made an appearance as the leading girl in the music video of Hoya's single, "Baby U".

In April 2019, she contributed to the Welcome to Waikiki 2 OST with "Delight". Chu later contributed to the Home for Summer OST with "A Thousand Days' Love" in August 2019. In October 2019, she debuted as an actress through the web series Spunk, wherein she portrayed Ari. In the same month, Chu formally released "I Want to See You Tomorrow" for the My Sweet Melody OST, whose music video initially premiered in March 2019.

On January 24, 2020, she starred in the music video of "Count to Three Like a Habit" by KCM. Chu starred in the web series Live with a Ghost. She has been attempting to expand her career into China.

On 4 October 2023, it was announced that she had signed with New Way Company under the stage name Kriesha.

In October 2025, Kriesha participated in the fourth season of Sing Again, as a contestant number 64. However, she was eliminated in the 3rd episode.

== Discography ==
=== Extended plays ===
Title	Album details	Peak chart positions
Title	Album details	KOR
Dream of Paradise	Released: January 3, 2018; Label: Urban Works Entertainment, CJ E&M Music; Formats: CD, digital download; Track listing: 1. "Like Paradise" (featuring Flow Blow); 2. "Sunset Dream" (Korean version); 3. "Sunset Dream" (English version); 4. "Falling Star" (featuring Kim Min-ju)	70

=== Single albums ===
Title	Album details	Peak chart positions
Title	Album details	KOR
Kriesha Chu 1st Single Album	Released: May 24, 2017; Label: Urban Works Entertainment, LOEN Entertainment; Formats: CD, digital download; Track listing: 1. "I Want You" (featuring Yong Jun-hyung); 2. "Trouble"	35

=== Singles ===
Title	Year	Album
"Trouble"	2017	Kriesha Chu 1st Single Album
"Like Paradise"	2018	Dream of Paradise
"I Want To See You Again"	2019	I Want To See You Again
"올레길 (지집아이)"	2020	올레길

=== Soundtrack appearances ===
Title	Year	Peak chart positions	Album
Title	Year	KOR	Album
"Wings" (날개) (with Jeon Min-ju)	2017	—	K-Pop Star Season 6 Top 10
"Crazy in Love"	2017	—	K-Pop Star Season 6 Top 8
"Say You Love Me" (좋아한다 말해) (with Samuel)	2017	—	Pink Pink OST
"Delight"	2019	—	Welcome to Waikiki 2 OST
"A Thousand Days' Love" (천일의 사랑)	2019	— (Note: "A Thousand Days' Love" did not enter the Gaon Digital Chart, but debuted and peaked at number 17 on the Gaon BGM Chart.)	Home for Summer OST
"I Want to See You Tomorrow" (내일도 보고싶어)	2019	—	My Sweet Melody OST

== Filmography ==
=== Web series ===
Year	Title	Role	Ref.
2019	Spunk	Kang Ari	
2020	Live with a Ghost	Yeon Su-ji	

=== Television shows ===
Year	Title	Role	Notes	Ref.
2016–2017	K-pop Star 6: The Last Chance	Contestant	Runner-up	
2017	Eodi Road	Herself		
2017	We Are Also National Athletes	Participant		
2018	Travel Agency	Cast member		
2018	King of Mask Singer	Contestant	Credited as "Gumiho"	
2025	Sing Again season 4	Contestant	Eliminated at the first round	

=== Music video appearances ===
Year	Title	Artist	Ref.
2020	"Count to Three Like a Habit"	KCM	

== Stage ==
=== Concert ===
Year	Title	Venue	Date	Ref.
2024	Kriesha Playlist	Lim Art Center	December 23	
