= Batzorig =

Batzorig is a name. Notable people with the name include:

- Batzorig Vaanchig (born 1977), Mongolian throat singer
- Buyanjavyn Batzorig (born 1983), Mongolian wrestler
