= Gerphil Flores =

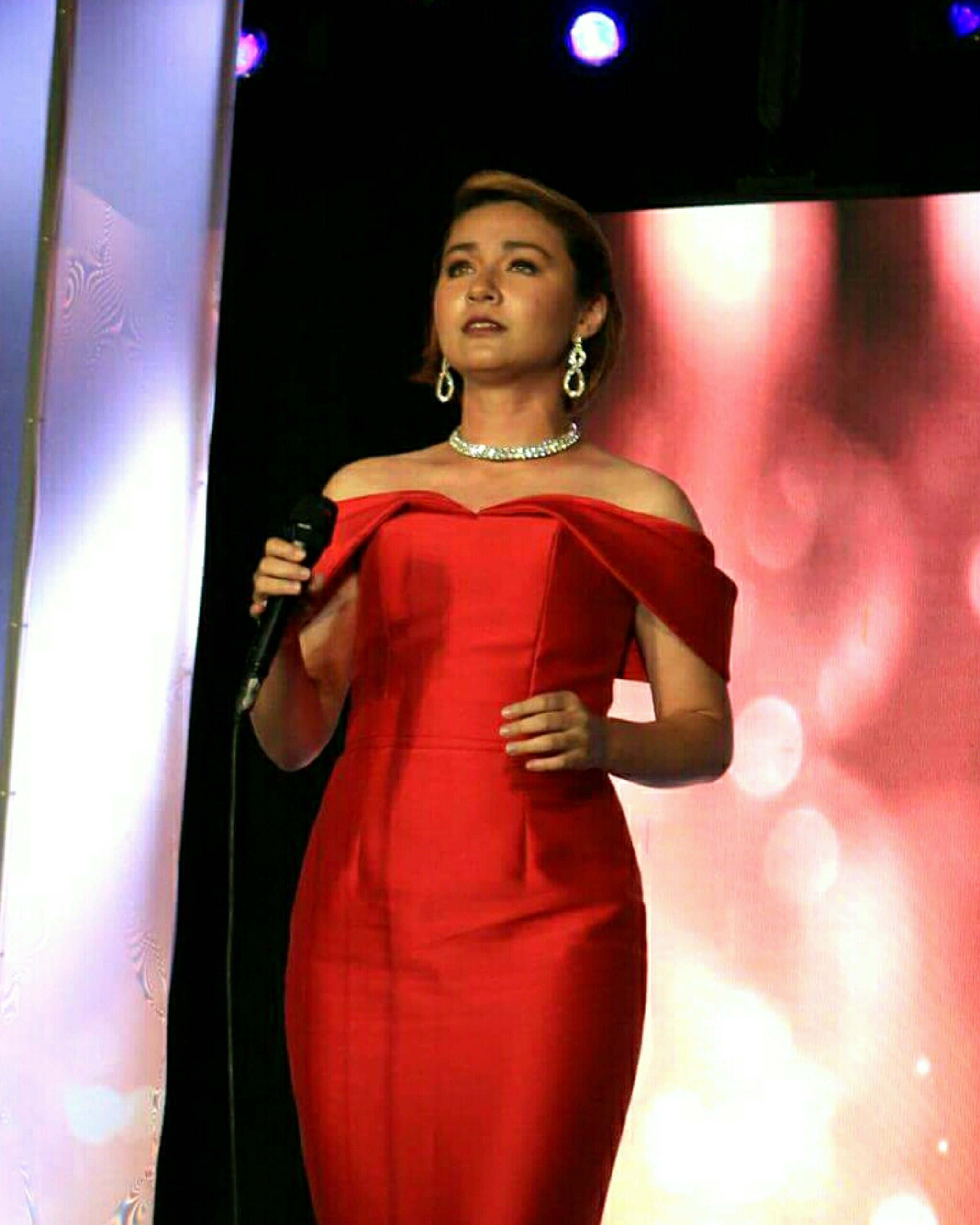

Background information
- Born: Gerphil Geraldine Flores; 29 September 1990 (age 35); Hamburg, Germany
- Origin: Germany
- Genres: Classical crossover, classical
- Instrument: Vocals (soprano)
- Years active: 2001–present

Gerphil Geraldine Flores is a German-Filipino classical crossover singer. In 2015, she joined the inaugural season of Asia's Got Talent, where she finished as second runner-up. A soprano, she was dubbed "Asia's Golden Girl."

== Personal life ==
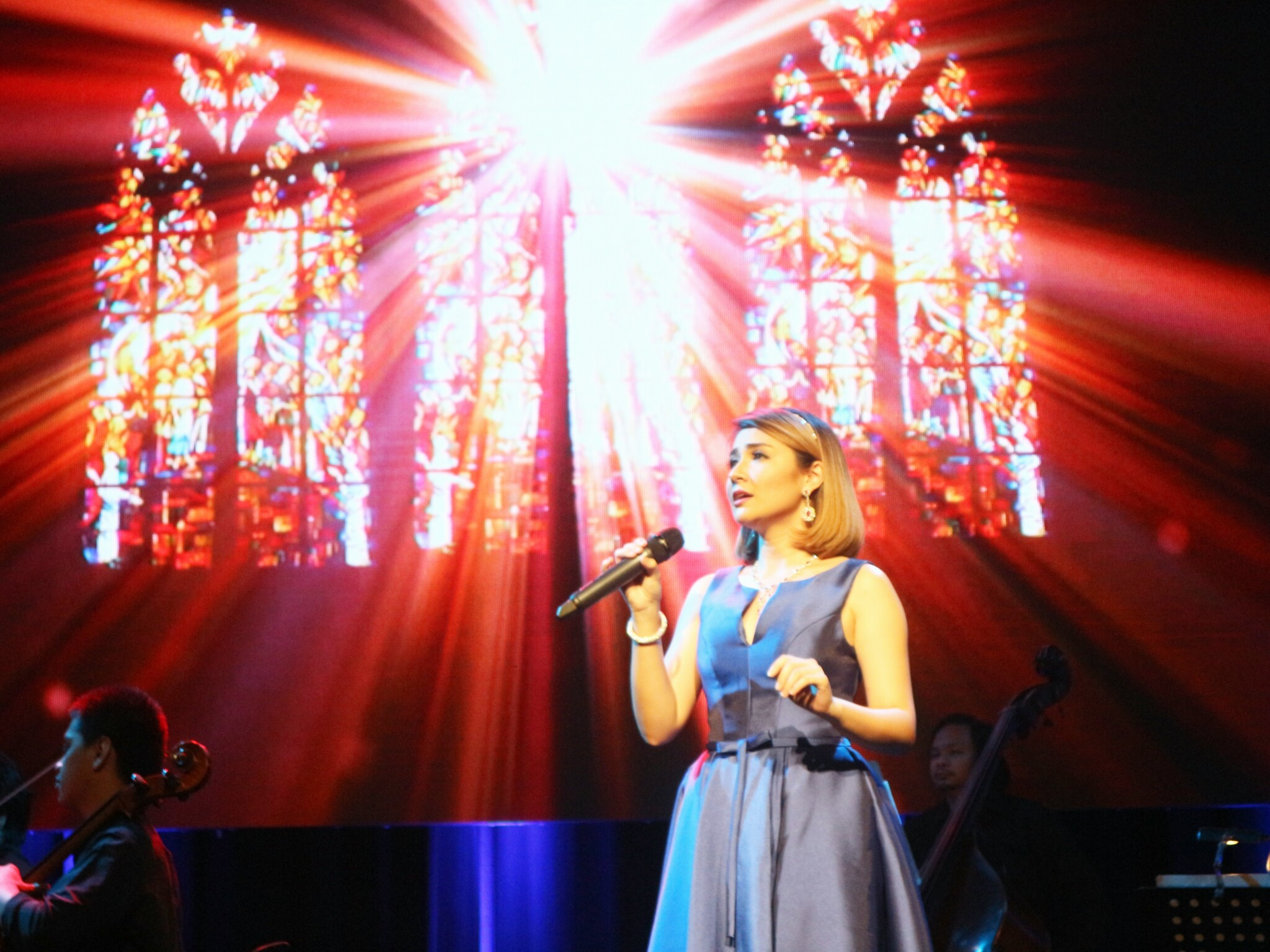
Gerphil Flores celebrating her 26th Birthday with a concert at Music Museum

Flores was born in Hamburg, Germany to a German father and a Filipino mother of Chinese, Japanese and Spanish descent.

== Career ==
=== Formative years, training and education ===
As an infant, Flores' parents regularly brought her to German opera houses. By the age of three, she began singing compositions by Wolfgang Amadeus Mozart, such as the aria "Queen of The Night" from The Magic Flute, and Ludwig van Beethoven.

After they relocated to the Philippines in 1994, Flores' love for music was further encouraged and nurtured by her family of music lovers, notably her maternal grandfather, a skilled Kundiman guitarist, and her mother who listened to various genres including classical, Broadway, and jazz.

By 11, Flores has decided to pursue a career in music. She would sing everyday and her mother would listen and observe if her daughter had the right pitch, or sounded flat or sharp.

To further hone her singing, Flores had voice lessons under New York City-based soprano Evelyn Mandac during the latter's trips to Manila. Upon Mandac's advice, Flores started to formally study voice under University of the Philippines College of Music Associate Professor Katherine "Kitchie" Molina, a former chair at the voice, music theatre, and dance department, where Flores graduated with a diploma in creative performing musical arts, major in voice.

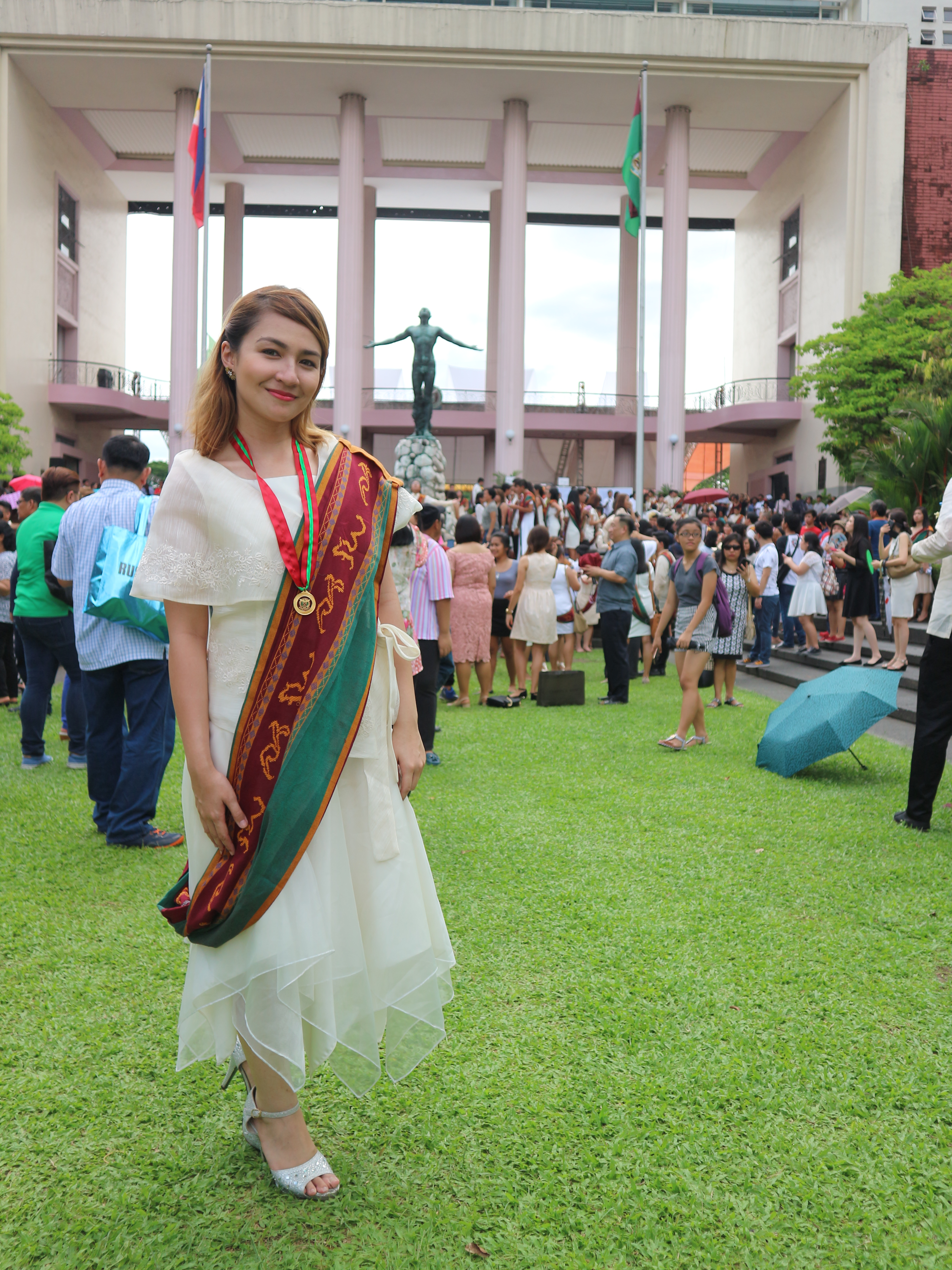
Flores during her graduation at the University of the Philippines Diliman, 2016

On 26 June 2016, Flores graduated cum laude with a bachelor's degree in music (major in voice) and a diploma in creative performing musical arts from the College of Music, University of the Philippines Diliman in Quezon City. She made it to the dean's list (college scholar) in the first semester of academic school year 2015–16, with a general weighted average of 1.468.

=== Theatre and opera years ===
Since age 11, Flores joined several musical and opera productions. She was the lead child performer in the Philippine Opera Company's children's adaptation of Mozart's The Magic Flute.

Her credits also include Repertory Philippines’ The Sound of Music, Trumpets’ High School Musical and First Name, Gantimpala Theater Foundation' María Clara in Noli Me Tángere and The Necklace and Kikay in New Yorker in Tondo, Kids Acts Philippines’ Alice in Alice in Wonderland, The Little Mermaid and Juliet in Romeo and Juliet, Mary in Fides Cuyugan-Asencio's Song of Joseph and Maria Makiling in Legend of M, and Gregoria de Jesús in Jerry Dadap's Andres Bonifacio.

As an opera performer, her credits include playing Anne Page in the opera production of UP College of Music's Merry Wives of Windsor and as Cio-Cio San and Kate Pinkerton alternates in Music Artes’ production of Giacomo Puccini’s Madame Butterfly held at the Cultural Center of the Philippines in Pasay. She also assayed the role of Rusalka in Antonin Dvorak's opera of the same name at the same venue in September 2014; this performance earned her an Aliw Award nomination as Best Actress in a Musical at the 28th Aliw Awards.

=== Asia's Got Talent ===
On 28 September 2014, the 24-year-old Flores pre-auditioned for the inaugural season of Asia's Got Talent, the regional version of the Got Talent franchise, as Gerphil Flores and advanced to the televised audition. Her televised audition aired on AXN Asia on 9 April 2015, where she sang "Speak Softly, Love" from the film The Godfather. Flores' performance was praised and earned her a standing ovation from both the audience and the four judges, particularly Canadian musician and record producer David Foster who praised her pitch, saying: "You certainly did not disappoint anybody in this room. It was really a solid performance. And your pitch is great, and I hate people who sing out of tune. You sang really in tune." With three of the judges voting yes, Foster pressed the golden buzzer, automatically sending her to the semifinals.

In the semi-final round held on 23 April 2015, Flores performed an operatic ballad version of the song "Love Story (Where Do I Begin?)" from the film Love Story, which elicited another standing ovation. Foster continued to praise her voice, saying that he could make her sound better if she would work with him, while English singer-songwriter and former Spice Girls member Melanie C said that she "deserved to be on the world stage" and Indonesian singer Anggun said that "she looked like a real diva" that night. On 30 April 2015, the show revealed that Flores was one of two acts from the previous week (the other being Mongolian musical ensemble Khusugtun) that had advanced to the finals through the public vote.

In the final round on 7 May 2015, Flores performed her version of "The Impossible Dream" (Mitch Leigh) from the musical Man of La Mancha. After another standing ovation, Foster promised Flores that "the world is going to know about you." At the results episode, aired on AXN Asia on 14 May 2015, after a tally of audience votes, Flores garnered the third highest votes among 12 finalists, after eventual grand champion, Filipino dance group El Gamma Penumbra, and runner-up, Khusugtun. She finished second runner-up in a field of 4,000 hopefuls.

=== Concerts and tours ===
On 11 December 2015, Flores had her first major solo concert, A Golden Treasure, at The Theatre at Solaire along the Bay City area of Parañaque. The concert featured songs from different genres that displayed her diversity as a classical-crossover performer; it also featured a live accompaniment by the Manila Symphony Orchestra, duets with McDonald's Philippines and Klassikal Music Foundation's George Yang, balladeer Nonoy Zuñiga and her dance number with Junior New System. This concert won the Aliw Awards 2016' Best Major Concert (Female).

The success of her first concert led to her pre-Valentine's Day solo concert, Tales of Love, at the same venue on 11 February–12, 2016. The concert featured love songs from different genres and languages with the Manila Philharmonic Orchestra, Junior New System and singers Kris Gonzales, Al Gatmaitan, Jack Salud and singer-songwriter Jose Mari Chan.

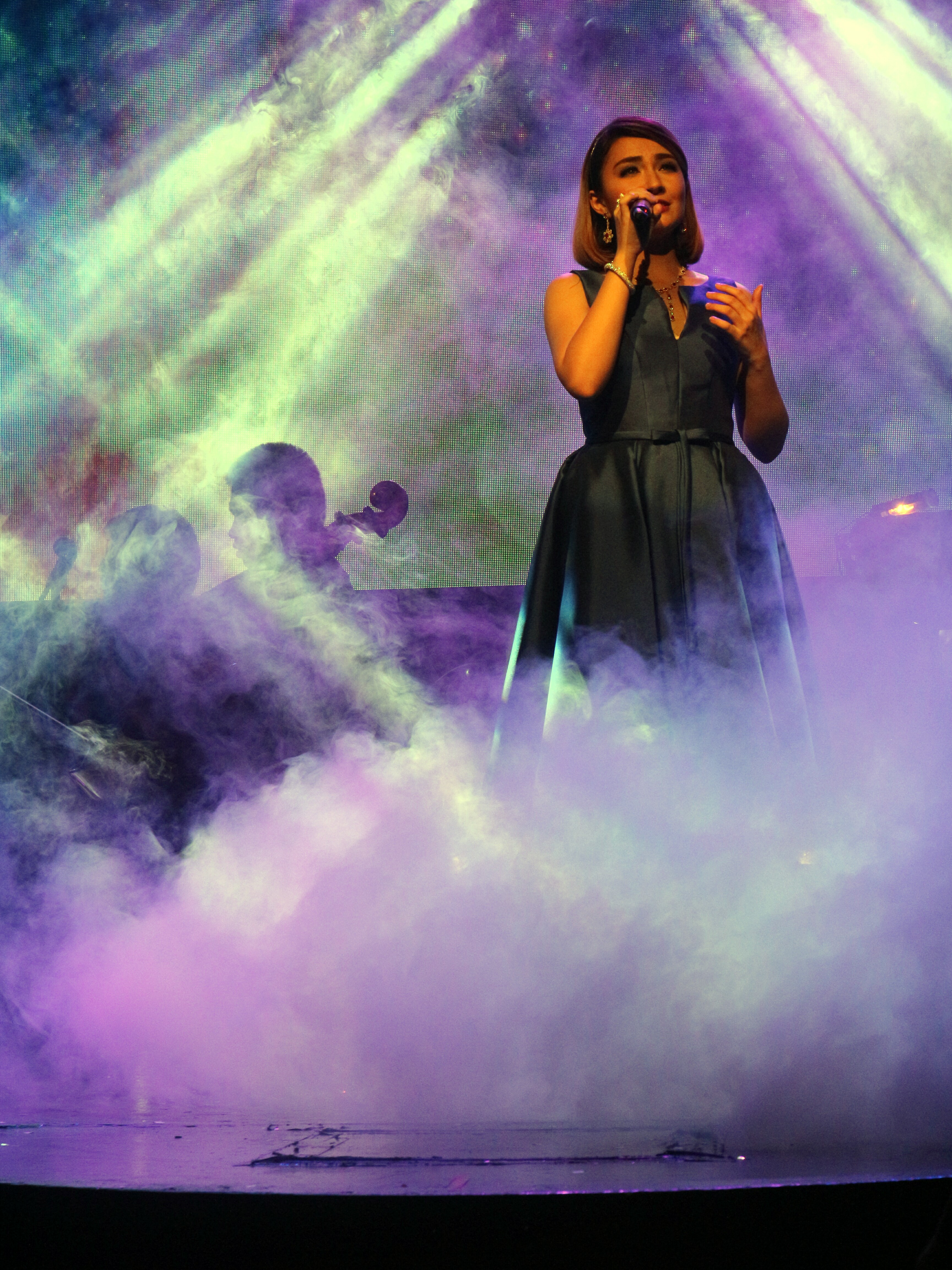
Flores on her 26th birthday concert at the Music Museum, 2016.

Flores was tapped by Asia's Got Talent judge David Foster to be part of his David Foster and Friends Asian Tour for 2015–16; she made her debut at the Hitman Tour at the Smart Araneta Coliseum in Quezon City on 17 August 2015, performing alongside Ruben Studdard, Natalie Cole, Charice Pempengco, Boyz II Men and Mark Mabasa.

Flores celebrated her 26th birthday with a soldout solo concert, Gerphil at 26, at The Music Museum on 29 September 2016. The concert featured a diverse set list; the repertoire covered hits from the 60s, 70s, and 80s, current songs of 2016, and even went as far back as the 1800s. Some she sang with her famous classical style; others she rendered with pop and jazz inflections, accompanied by the Manila Symphony Orchestra. The concert also featured performances from Daryl Ong and Clem Castro.

=== Magazine covers ===
After her stint at Asia's Got Talent, Flores was featured in the cover of the June 2015 issue of The Philippine Star’s GIST magazine and the July 2015 issue of Manila Bulletin’s Publishing's Sense & Style magazine.

== Personal life ==
In 2019, Flores married Brad Libanan.

== Awards and nominations ==
Year	Award	Category	Result	Source
2009	Aliw Award	Best Female Classical Performer	Nominated	
2010	Aliw Award	Best Female Classical Performer	Nominated	
2011	Aliw Award	Best Female Classical Performer	Nominated	
2013	Aliw Award	Best Crossover/Broadway Performer	Won	
2014	Aliw Award	Best Female Classical Performer	Won	
2015	Gawad Musika	Most Promising International Performing Artist	Won	
2015	Eastwood City Walk of Fame	Star	Won	
2015	Aliw Award	Best Female Crossover Performer	Won	
2015	Aliw Award	Best Female Classical Performer	Won	
2015	Aliw Award	Entertainer of the Year	Won	
2015	Aliw Award	Best Actress in A Musical (Rusalka/NCCA/CCP)	Nominated	
2016	Aliw Award	Best Crossover Performer	Won	
2016	Aliw Award	Best Female Major Concert (A Golden Treasure, Theatre at Solaire)	Won	
