= Lee Mu-jin =

South Korean singer

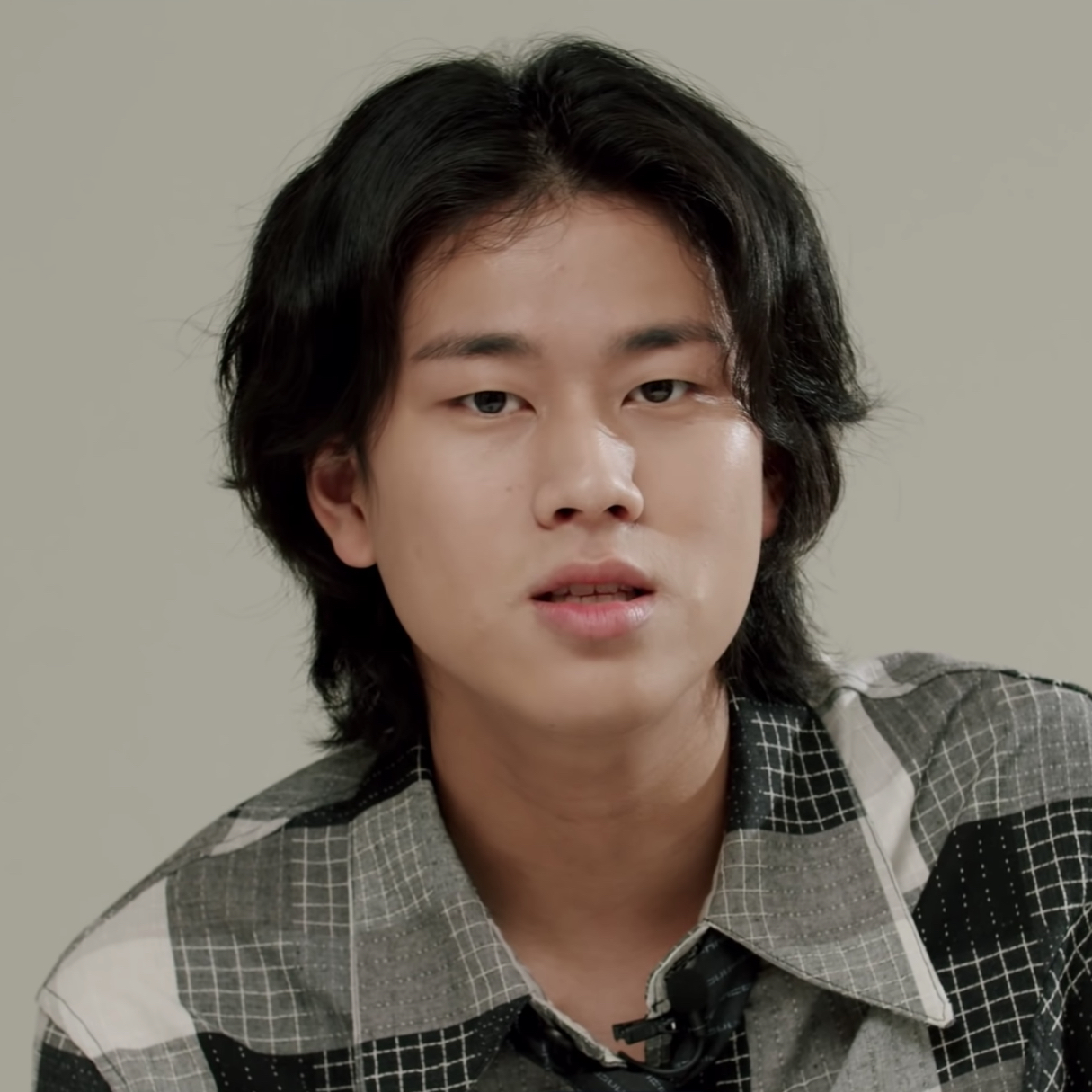
- Lee in 2021

Background information
- Born: December 28, 2000 (age 25); Goyang, Gyeonggi Province, South Korea
- Genres: Folk; pop
- Occupations: Singer; songwriter
- Instruments: Vocals; guitar
- Years active: 2018–present
- Labels: Show Play; BPM; Mound Media
- Website: Official website

Korean name
- Hangul: 이무진
- Hanja: 李茂珍
- RR: I Mujin
- MR: I Mujin

Lee Mu-jin (Korean: 이무진; born December 28, 2000) is a South Korean singer and songwriter. He rose to fame after appearing on the music audition show Sing Again in 2020, in which he finished in 3rd place. His 2021 single, "Traffic Light", spent three weeks at number one on South Korea's Gaon Digital Chart. Since 2022, he is the main host on KBS music web show, LeeMujin Service.

== Personal life ==
Lee was born in Goyang, Gyeonggi Province, South Korea. He is a student at Seoul Institute of the Arts.

== Discography ==
=== Extended plays ===
List of extended plays, showing selected details, selected chart positions, and sales figures
Title	Details	Peak chart positions	Sales
Title	Details	KOR	Sales
Room Vol.1	Released: June 23, 2022; Label: BPM Entertainment; Formats: CD, digital download, streaming; Track listing: 1. "Reference" (참고사항); 2. "Astronut" (우주비행사); 3. "Room No.8" (8번 연습실); 4. "To. Greedy" (욕심쟁아); 5. "Orpheus" (자취방); 6. "Traffic Light" (신호등) (CD only); 7. "The Assignment Song" (과제곡) (CD only); 8. "Scent of the Day" (담아 갈게) (CD only)	31	KOR: 5,015
Youth (만화 (滿花))	Released: October 7, 2024; Label: BPM Entertainment; Formats: CD, digital download, streaming; Track listing: 1. "Persona" (가면 세계); 2. "Mumu's Day" (무무의 하루); 3. "Coming of Age Story" (청춘만화); 4. "Starlight" (별자리); 5. "Two of Us" (우리 둘이서); 6. "Translucent Stranger" (반투명 이방인)	26	KOR: 4,083

=== Singles ===
Title	Year	Peak chart positions		Certifications	Album
Title	Year	KOR	KOR Hot	Certifications	Album
"Traffic Light" (신호등)	2021	1	1	KMCA: 2× Platinum	Non-album singles
"The Assignment Song" (과제곡)	2021	100	96		Non-album singles
"Scent of the Day" (담아 갈게)	2021	72	59		Non-album singles
"Fall in Fall" (가을 타나 봐) (original by Vibe)	2021	14	25		Non-album singles
"When It Snows" (눈이 오잖아) (featuring Heize)	2021	6	7	KMCA: Platinum	Non-album singles
"Reference" (참고사항)	2022	65	—N/a		Room Vol.1
"Ordinary Confession" (잠깐 시간 될까)	2023	23	—N/a		Non-album singles
"Episode" (에피소드)	2023	6	—N/a		Non-album singles
"Propose" (청혼하지 않을 이유를 못 찾았어)	2024	56	—N/a		Non-album singles
"Old Song" (오래된 노래) (with Huh Gak, Onestar, Lee Jin-sung, Kim Hee-jae and An Nyeong)	2024	27	—N/a		Non-album singles
"Sorrow Thoughts" (애상)	2024	86	—N/a		Non-album singles
"Coming of Age Story" (청춘만화)	2024	26	—N/a		Youth
"Bird on the Edge" (뱁새)	2025	106	—N/a		Non-album singles
"Night Stage" (밤무대)	2026	157	—N/a		Non-album singles
"—" denotes a recording that did not chart or was not released in that territory.

=== Soundtrack appearances ===
Title	Year	Peak chart positions		Album
Title	Year	KOR	KOR Hot	Album
"Sanchaek" (산책)	2018	—	—	Goyang Voice
"Poupelle of Chimney Town" (굴뚝마을의 푸펠)	2021	—	—	Poupelle of Chimney Town OST
"Rain and You" (비와 당신)	2021	11	15	Hospital Playlist Season 2 OST
"Come Rest with Me" (그대 잠시 내게)	2021	104	—	Now, We Are Breaking Up OST
"Sweet" (스윗해)	2022	169	—	Business Proposal OST
"Firefly" (개똥벌레)	2022	126	—	Ditto OST
"Slainte!" (슬랜트!)	2022	— (Note: "Slainte" did not enter the Circle Digital Chart, but peaked at number 35 and 98 on the Circle Download Chart and Circle BGM Chart, respectively.)	—N/a	Playlist Season 2 OST
"—" denotes a recording that did not chart.

=== Compilation appearances ===
Title	Year	Peak chart positions		Album
Title	Year	KOR	KOR Hot	Album
"Is There Anybody" (누구 없소)	2020	123	53	Sing Again
"Whistle" (휘파람)	2020	112	40	Sing Again
"Lying on the Sea" (바다에 누워)	2021	163	—	Sing Again
"Dream" (꿈)	2021	116	90	Sing Again
"Side Road" (골목길)	2021	130	—	Sing Again
"I Miss You"	2022	— (Note: "I Miss You" did not enter the Gaon Digital Chart, but peaked at number 56 and 75 on the Gaon Download Chart and Gaon BGM Chart, respectively.)	92	You Hee-yeol's Sketchbook
"Three of Us" (세 사람)	2022	— (Note: "Three of Us" did not enter the Gaon Digital Chart, but peaked at number 65 and 106 on the Gaon Download Chart and Gaon BGM Chart, respectively.)	72	You Hee-yeol's Sketchbook
"Long Time Lovers" (아주 오래된 연인들) (with Choi Jung-hoon)	2022	— (Note: "Long Time Lovers" did not enter the Gaon Digital Chart, but peaked at number 69 and 92 on the Gaon Download Chart and Gaon BGM Chart, respectively.)	—	You Hee-yeol's Sketchbook
"—" denotes a recording that did not chart.

== Filmography ==
=== Television shows ===
Year	Title	Role	Notes	Ref.
2020	Sing Again	Contestant	Placed third	
2021	Famous Singer	Cast Member	Spin-off of Sing Again	
2022	Baby Singer	Teacher		
2022	Sing for Gold	Manager		
2022	Playlist	Main Cast	Season 2	

=== Web shows ===
Year	Title	Role	Ref.
2022–present	LeeMujin Service	Host	

== Concert ==
- Bonus Book Appendix (2022–2023)

== Accolades ==
=== Awards and nominations ===
Name of the award ceremony, year presented, category, nominee of the award, and the result of the nomination
Award ceremony	Year	Category	Nominee(s) / Work(s)	Result	Ref.
APAN Star Awards	2022	Best Original Soundtrack	"Sweet"	Nominated	
Broadcast Advertising Festival	2023	Excellence Award, CF	Lee Mu-jin	Won	
Circle Chart Music Awards	2022	New Artist of the Year – Digital Music	"Scent of the Day"	Won	
Circle Chart Music Awards	2022	Artist of the Year (Digital Music) – September	"Fall in Fall"	Nominated	
Golden Disc Awards	2022	Digital Song Bonsang	"Traffic Light"	Won	
Golden Disc Awards	2022	Seezn Most Popular Artist Award	Lee Mu-jin	Nominated	
Hanteo Music Awards	2021	Special Award – OST	Lee Mu-jin	Won	
Hanteo Music Awards	2021	Artist Award – Male Solo	Lee Mu-jin	Nominated	
KBS Entertainment Awards	2022	Digital Content Award	LeeMujin Service	Won	
KBS Entertainment Awards	2023	Best Icon Award	LeeMujin Service	Won	
KBS Entertainment Awards	2024	Popularity Award	LeeMujin Service	Won	
K-Global Heart Dream Awards	2022	K-Global Vocal Award	Lee Mu-jin	Won	
Korea Grand Music Awards	2024	Best Memory	Lee Mu-jin	Won	
Korea Grand Music Awards	2024	Best Rock Ballad	Lee Mu-jin	Won	
Korean Music Awards	2022	Rookie of the Year	Lee Mu-jin	Nominated	
Korean Music Awards	2022	Best Pop Song	"Traffic Light"	Nominated	
Korean Music Awards	2022	Song of the Year	"Traffic Light"	Nominated	
MAMA Awards	2024	Best Vocal Performance – Solo	Lee Mu-jin	Nominated	
Melon Music Awards	2021	Rookie of the Year	Lee Mu-jin	Won	
Melon Music Awards	2021	Top 10 Artist Award	Lee Mu-jin	Won	
Melon Music Awards	2021	Best OST Award	Lee Mu-jin	Won	
Melon Music Awards	2021	Best Male Artist	Lee Mu-jin	Nominated	
Melon Music Awards	2021	Song of the Year	"Traffic Light"	Nominated	
Melon Music Awards	2022	Top 10 Artist Award	Lee Mu-jin	Nominated	
Melon Music Awards	2022	Artist of the Year	Lee Mu-jin	Nominated	
Mnet Asian Music Awards	2021	Best Vocal Performance	"Traffic Light"	Nominated	
Mnet Asian Music Awards	2021	Best OST	"Rain and You"	Nominated	
Mnet Asian Music Awards	2021	Best Male Artist	Lee Mu-jin	Nominated	
Mnet Asian Music Awards	2021	Worldwide Fans' Choice Top 10	Lee Mu-jin	Nominated	
Mnet Asian Music Awards	2022	Best Vocal Performance – Solo	"When It Snows" (featuring Heize)	Nominated	
Mnet Asian Music Awards	2022	Song of the Year	"When It Snows" (featuring Heize)	Nominated	
Seoul Music Awards	2022	Rookie of the Year	Lee Mu-jin	Won	
Seoul Music Awards	2022	Popularity Award	Lee Mu-jin	Nominated	
Seoul Music Awards	2022	K-wave Popularity Award	Lee Mu-jin	Nominated	
Seoul Music Awards	2022	OST Award	"Rain and You"	Nominated	
Seoul Music Awards	2025	Main Prize (Bonsang)	Lee Mu-jin	Nominated	
Seoul Music Awards	2025	Ballad Award	Lee Mu-jin	Nominated	
Seoul Music Awards	2025	Popularity Award	Lee Mu-jin	Nominated	
Seoul Music Awards	2025	K-Wave Special Award	Lee Mu-jin	Nominated	
Seoul Music Awards	2025	K-pop World Choice – Solo	Lee Mu-jin	Nominated	
Seoul Music Awards	2025	OST Award	"In Our Lives"	Nominated	

=== Listicles ===
Name of publisher, year listed, name of listicle, and placement
Publisher	Year	Listicle	Placement	Ref.
Forbes	2022	Korea Power Celebrity	35th	
