= Batzorig Vaanchig =

Mongolian traditional throat singer

- Ваанчигийн Батзориг
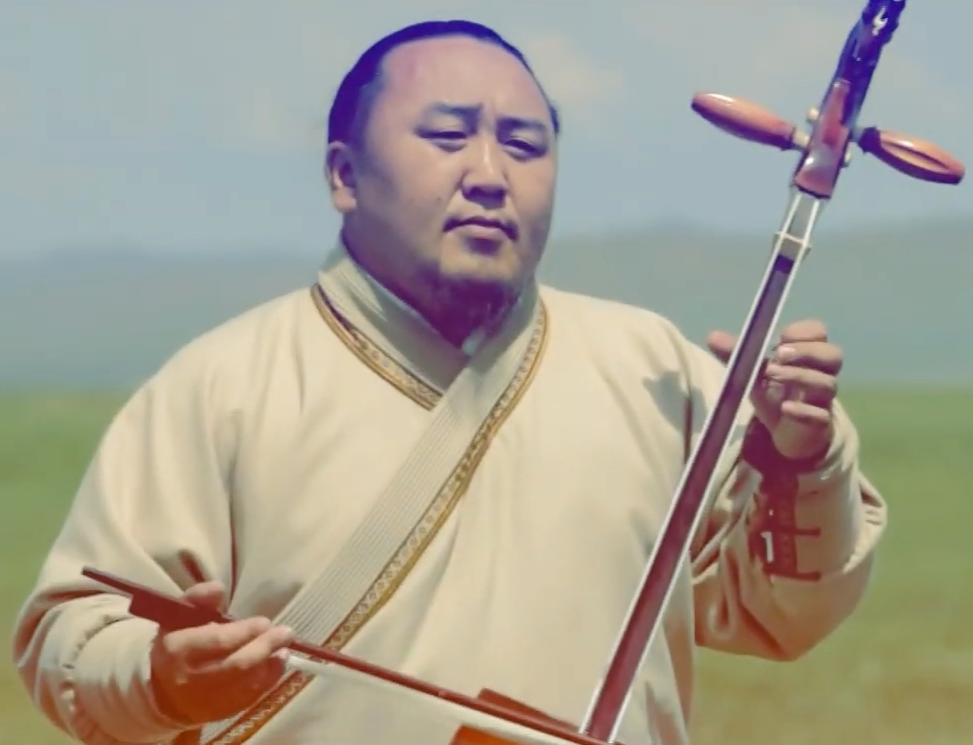
- Vaanchig in 2014
- Born: 3 August 1977 (age 49); Zag, Bayankhongor, Mongolian People's Republic
- Education: Institute of Culture (Ulaanbaatar)
- Years active: 2000–present
- Known for: Throat singing, Morin Khuur, Khusugtun
- Notable work: "The Great Chinggis Khaan"
- Children: 3
- Awards: Order of the Polar Star; Best Officer of Culture
- Website: www.batzorigvaanchig.com

Batzorig Vaanchig (Mongolian: Ваанчигийн Батзориг, romanized: Vaanchigiyn Batzorig; born August 3, 1977) is a Mongolian musician. He first garnered attention for a video of him singing "Chinggis Khaanii Magtaal" (In Praise of Genghis Khan) on top of a mountain in Mongolia.

== Career ==
In 2014, Batzorig started uploading videos of himself throat singing onto YouTube. A video of him singing "Chinggis Khaanii Magtaal", a Mongolian folk song, on top of a mountain in Bayanhongor, Mongolia, whilst playing a morin khuur, went viral and now has over 39 million views as of 2026. Also in 2014, Batzorig made a cameo in the Netflix series Marco Polo, as a throat singing musician in a military camp. Batzorig is also part of the folk ensemble Khusugtun. On December 4, 2022, he released his only solo album "The Great Chinggis Khaan."

In August 2023, Batzorig performed his throat singing on CNN to Richard Quest in Ulaanbaatar, during Quest's visit in Mongolia.

In April 2025, Batzorig collaborated with the streamer iShowSpeed during his visit to Mongolia. He performed for the streamer at the Chinggis Khaan National Museum in Ulaanbaatar.

He has collaborated twice with game publisher Paradox Interactive, producing, composing, and singing "Nomad" for Crusader Kings III's DLC Khans of the Steppe, and "Manduul Haan" for Stellaris's DLC Nomads.

== Personal life ==
Batzorig has three children. Batzorig has social media accounts on Facebook, YouTube, Instagram, and Patreon, which he uses in both personal and professional aspects. He also has his own website, detailing his musical career and personal life.
