= Shannon (South Korean singer) =

British streamer and former singer (born 1998)

- 샤넌
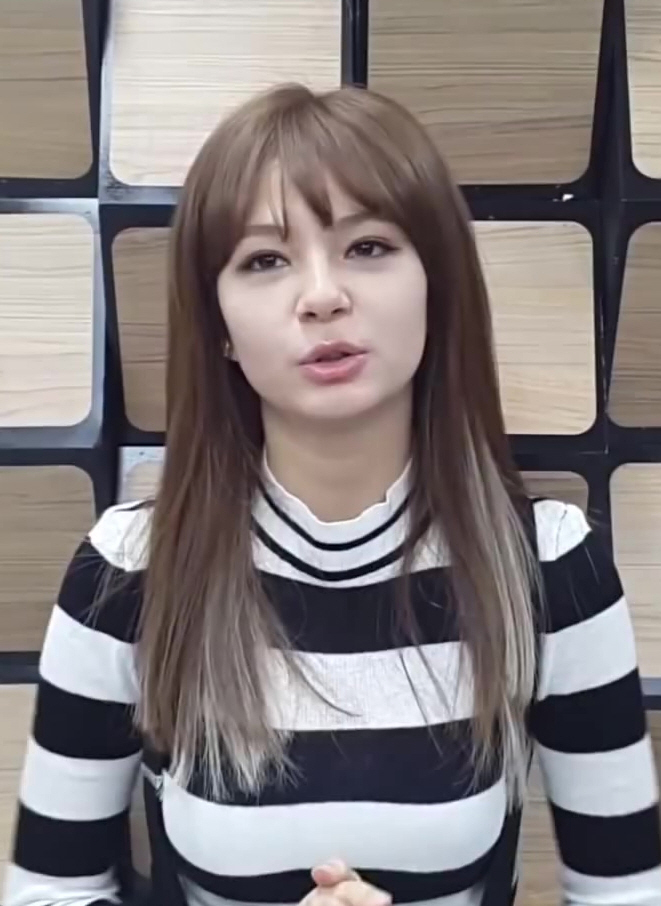
- Shannon in 2014
- Born: Shannon Arrum Williams; 26 May 1998 (age 28); London, England
- Education: Dwight School Seoul (dropped out)
- Occupations: Streamer; singer
- Years active: 2011–present
- Musical career
- Genres: K-pop; R&B
- Instrument: Vocals
- Years active: 2011–2019
- Label: MBK

Korean name
- Hangul: 김아름
- Hanja: 金아름
- RR: Gim Areum
- MR: Kim Arŭm

Shannon Arrum Williams (born 26 May 1998), known mononymously as Shannon, is a British streamer, former singer and voice of Jett from Valorant. In South Korea, she is known for being a contestant of K-pop Star 6: The Last Chance. Prior to debut, Shannon has released two singles: "Day and Night" with T-ara's Areum and Gavy NJ's Gun-ji in September 2012 and then "Remember You" featuring Speed's Jongkook in January 2014 before making her official debuted in December 2014 with digital single "Daybreak Rain". Since her debut, she has released two extended plays, six singles and three soundtrack appearances. In 2016, Shannon also made her debut as an actress with cast in drama Moorim School: Saga of the Brave. In 2019, Shannon left MBK Entertainment after the expiration of her contract. She has since retired as a singer and currently resides in London, now works as a Twitch streamer.

== Early life and pre-debut ==
Shannon Arrum Williams was born on 26 May 1998 in England to a Welsh father, Lees, and to a Korean mother, Kim Jung-mi. Shannon (Korean name: Kim Arrum, Korean: 김아름; RR: Gim Areum) is the youngest child in her family. She has two older paternal twin half-brothers, Christian and Jonah Lees. She attended Sylvia Young Theatre School in London and—at the age of 7—she was given the role of Cosette in the musical Les Misérables. Shannon studied at Dwight School Seoul but dropped out before completion.

Early in her career, Shannon's original training was focused on performing as the main vocalist for an all-girl band. Later, her agency announced that, at her own request, she would be trained as a solo artist instead. She revealed this personally in a magazine interview stating, "I was preparing for a debut as the main vocalist of a girl group, but I had a lot of greed towards singing. I asked my agency to let me debut as a solo artist. I'm grateful that they decided to listen to me and I was able to go solo."

== Career ==
=== 2010–2014: Debut and career beginnings ===
Shannon first appeared in South Korean media on SBS's Star King in 2010 and gained attention after she displayed her singing in 2011. Core Contents Media recruited Shannon after seeing it that year.

In 2012, Shannon released a collaboration single, "Day and Night" with Areum (former member of T-ara) and Gun-ji (Gavy NJ) and was also featured in singer Yangpa's song "Together." On 23 November, Shannon appeared an episode of JTBC's Hidden Singer 2 as one of the impersonators of singer IU.

On 8 January 2014, Shannon appeared on JTBC's Hidden Singer 2 for the King of Kings finale round and performed IU's "Good Day" and Beyoncé's "Listen", but was eliminated before the final round. On 29 January, her pre-debut single "Remember You" featuring Speed's Jongkook was released to commemorate the end of her three-year training for her debut. On 12 February, Shannon made an appearance on her labelmate showcase, Speed Day, which aired on SBS MTV. She performed "Let It Go", a song from the film Frozen, and Rihanna's "Diamonds" with Dani. On 1 December, Shannon made her official debut with released digital single titled "Daybreak Rain". The single charted at number 32 on the Gaon digital chart. On 26 December, she, Vasco, and Giriboy released a collaboration single titled "Breath".

=== 2015–2018: Acting debut and K-pop Star 6 ===
On 6 March 2015, Shannon released her EP Eighteen, which consists of seven tracks with the lead single "Why Why". On 10 July 2015, Shannon collaborated with rapper Yuk Ji-dam and released the digital single "Love X Get Off". In September 2015, Shannon was confirmed to star in the KBS drama Moorim School.

On 3 March 2016, Shannon released a single called "Lachrymal Gland", featuring Soheechan as part of the 2gether project.

From 20 November 2016 to 9 April 2017, she took part in the TV reality show K-pop Star 6: The Last Chance. The prize was a contract that would grant the winner promotions from YG, JYP and Antenna Music. Shannon received high praise for her technical singing ability but was critiqued for her lack of emotion. She was selected into YG's group and sang songs such as "Man in the Mirror", "Who's Your Mama", "Happy", and "Ain't No Other Man". She advanced to the top 4 (semi-finals) before she was eliminated.

Shannon released her digital single "Love Don't Hurt" on 26 June 2017. The single contains two versions: a Korean version (featuring Lil' Boi) and an English version featuring f(x)'s Amber. Her second EP, Hello, released on 28 July with five tracks, including the accompanying title track of the same name and the previously released single "Love Don't Hurt". Shannon held her comeback showcase at the Yes24 Muv Hall on 27 July, one day before the album's release; she performed on Music Bank the next day. The music video for "Hello" was released on 31 July.

On 24 June 2018, Shannon released her third digital single "Hatred Farewell".

=== 2019–present: Departure from MBK ===
In the first half of 2019, Shannon announced she would leave MBK following the expiration of her contract in the same year.

In October 2019, Shannon was confirmed to cast in the musical We Will Rock You, as Scaramouche, which was held in December 2019.

== Discography ==
=== Extended plays ===
List of extended plays, showing selected details, selected chart positions, and sales figures
Title	Details	Peak chart positions	Sales
Title	Details	KOR	Sales
Eighteen	Released: 5 March 2015; Label: MBK Entertainment; Format: CD, digital download; Track listing: 1. 왜요 왜요 (Why Why); 2. I Know; 3. Gossip Girl; 4. 20 inch 5. Hate You; 6. 숨 Breath; 7. 새벽별 Daybreak Rain	17	KOR: 794+
Hello	Released: 28 July 2017; Label: MBK Entertainment; Format: CD, Digital download; Track listing: 1. Hello; 2. 가도 돼 Goodbye; 3. Love Don't Hurt (ft. Lil' Boi) (Korean version); 4. Love Don't Hurt (ft. Amber of f(x)) (English version); 5. Hello (instr.)	90	—N/a
"—" denotes releases that did not chart or were not released in that region.

=== Singles ===
Title	Year	Peak chart positions		Sales (digital downloads)	Album
Title	Year	KOR	KOR Hot 100	Sales (digital downloads)	Album
"Daybreak Rain" (새벽비)	2014	32	*	KOR: 66,255+	Eighteen
"Why Why" (왜요 왜요)	2015	100	*	KOR: 14,713+	Eighteen
"Love Don't Hurt" (feat. Lil' Boi) (눈물이 흘러)	2017	—	—	—N/a	Hello
"Hello"	2017	119	90	—N/a	Hello
"Like This Night" (이런 밤이면)	2017	—	—	—N/a	Non-album singles
"Hatred Farewell" (미워해 널 잘 지내지는 마)	2018	—	—	—N/a	Non-album singles
"—" denotes releases that did not chart or were not released in that region. "*" denotes the chart did not exist at that time.

=== Collaborations and soundtracks ===
Year	Song	Album	Notes
2012	"My Love"	Together	with Yangpa
2012	"Day and Night (Love All)" (낮과 밤)	Day and Night	with Lee Areum and Gavy NJ's Gun-ji
2014	"Remember You"	Remember You	with Jongkook
2014	"Breath" (숨)	Breath	with Vasco and Giriboy
2015	"My Love Who Loved Me More Than I Loved Myself" (나보다 더 나를 사랑하는 님이시여)	Immortal Songs: Singing the Legend (Composer Yoo Seung-yup)	
2015	"Remember and Love" (기억해 사랑해)	Shine or Go Crazy OST	
2015	"Love X Go Away" (사랑 X 꺼져)	Falling	with Yuk Ji-dam
2016	"Lachrymal Gland" (눈물샘)	Heyne – 2getherProject	with Soheechan
2017	"Who's You Mama?" (어머님이 누구니)	K-Pop Star Season 6 TOP10 Part.1	
2017	"See Through" (씨스루)	K-Pop Star Season 6 TOP8 Part.1	
2017	"Happy"	K-Pop Star Season 6 TOP6	
2017	"I Have A Girlfriend" (난 여자가 있는데)	K-Pop Star Season 6 TOP4	with Yuk Ji-dam
2017	"I Have a Lover (Best Actress Award for the Day Fennec Fox)" (애인있어요 (오늘의 여우주연상 사막여우))	King of Mask Singer Episode 115	
2017	"Stop the Time (Best Actress Award for the Day Fennec Fox)" (시간아 멈춰라 (오늘의 여우주연상 사막여우))	King of Mask Singer Episode 116	
2017	"Love Is...(3+3=0)"	Fantastic Duo 2 Part.13	with Park Seul-gi, Lee Hong-gi, DinDin, Sleepy & Jessi
2018	"Blue"	Dunia: Into a New World OST	with DinDin
2019	"Wind" (바람)	Item OST	

=== Concert ===
- Shannon First Live Concert (2014)

== Filmography ==
=== Video games ===
Year	Title	Role	Notes
2020	Valorant	Jett	Voice Actress

=== Television series ===
Year	Title	Role	Notes
2013	Hidden Singer	Contestant	S2 Ep. 7 Runner up
2016	Moorim School: Saga of the Brave	Shannon	Supporting role

== Theatre ==
Year	Title	Role
2008	Oliver Twist	Oliver Twist
2009	Les Misérables	Little Cosette

== Videography ==
=== Music videos ===
Year	Title	Length	Notes
2012	"Day and Night"	3:34	With ex T-ARA's member Areum and Gavy NJ's Gunji
2014	"Remember You"	4:32	With SPEED's Jongkook
2014	"Daybreak Rain"	3:57	
2014	"Breathe"	3:49	With Vasco and Giriboy
2015	"Why Why"	5:49	
2016	"Lachrymal Gland"	3:28	With Soheezzang
2017	"Love Don't Hurt"	3:33	Featuring Lil Boi
2017	"Hello"	3:34	

== Awards and nominations ==
=== Asia Artist Awards ===
Year	Nominee / work	Award	Result
2016	Shannon	Female Solo Singer Popularity Award	Nominated
2017	Shannon	Female Solo Singer Popularity Award	Nominated
2018	Shannon	Female Solo Singer Popularity Award	Nominated

=== Golden Disc Awards ===
Year	Nominee / work	Award	Result
2015	Shannon	Rookie of the Year	Nominated
2015	Shannon	Popularity Award	Nominated
2015	Shannon	Global Popularity Award	Nominated

=== Mnet Asian Music Awards ===
Year	Nominee / work	Award	Result
2014	Shannon	Best New Female Artist	Nominated
2014	Shannon	Artist of the Year	Nominated

=== Seoul Music Awards ===
Year	Nominee / work	Award	Result
2015	Shannon	Rookie of the Year	Nominated
2015	Shannon	Bonsang Award	Nominated
2015	Shannon	K-Wave Popularity Award	Nominated
2015	Shannon	Hallyu Special Award	Nominated
