= Asia's Got Talent season 1 =

Season 1 of Asia centric talent competition

Asia's Got Talent
- Season 1
- Hosted by: Marc Nelson; Rovilson Fernandez
- Judges: Anggun; David Foster; Melanie C Vanness Wu
- Winner: El Gamma Penumbra
- Runner-up: Khusugtun

Release
- Original network: AXN Asia
- Original release: March 12 – May 14, 2015

Season chronology
- Next → Season 2

The first season of Asia's Got Talent (AGT) started airing on March 12, 2015, across 15 countries in Asia, culminating to a grand final airing nine weeks later on May 14, 2015. It featured a grand prize of US$100,000 and an opportunity to perform at the Marina Bay Sands.

The show is hosted by Marc Nelson and Rovilson Fernandez; while the judges are Anggun, David Foster, Melanie C, and Vanness Wu. This show is also co-hosted by Singaporean YouTuber and Power98FM DJ's Dee Kosh for sneak previews, highlights, recaps, and behind the scenes.

The Filipino shadow play group El Gamma Penumbra was declared as the first season winner. News of their win leaked early through social media even before the broadcast of the results, causing dismay among netizens due to the spoiler nature of the leak.

== Auditions ==
Season 1 Judges

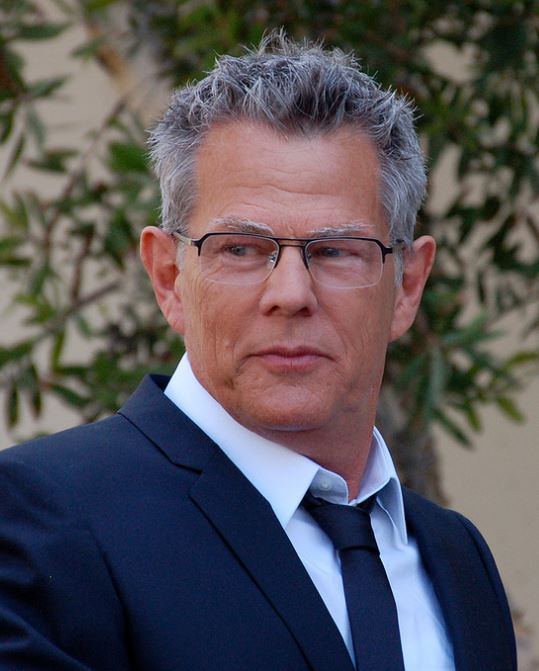
David Foster

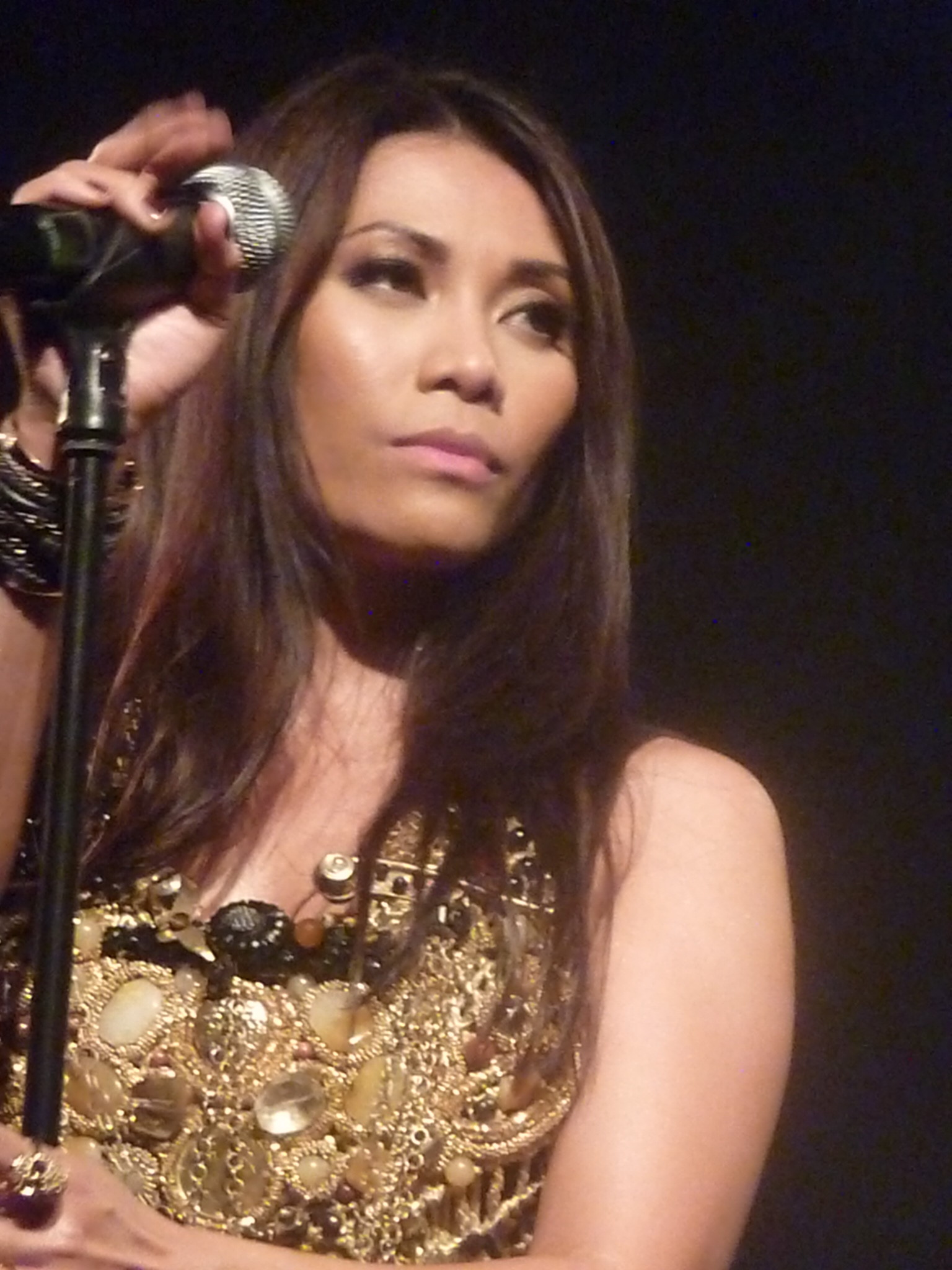
Anggun

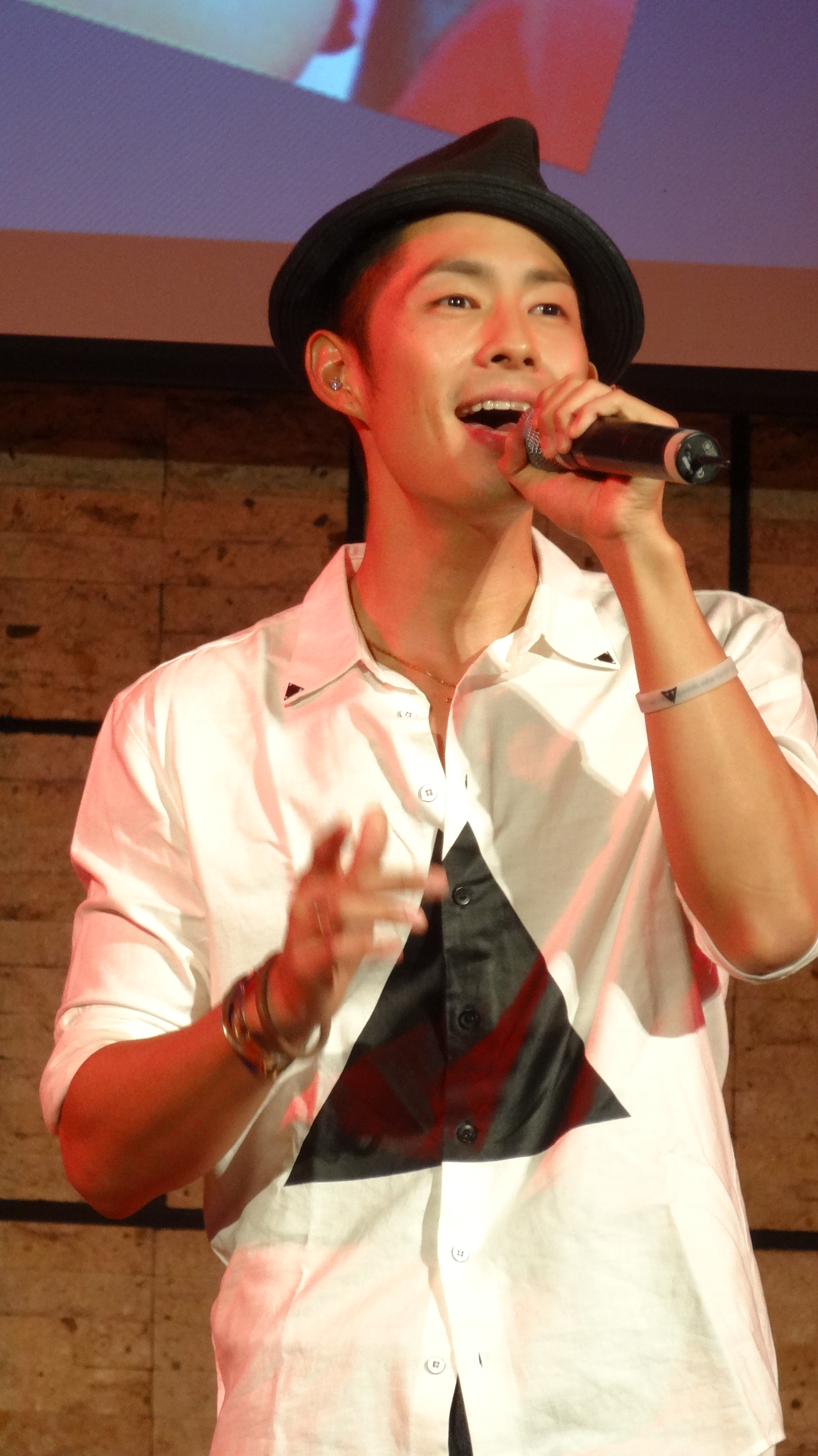
Vanness Wu

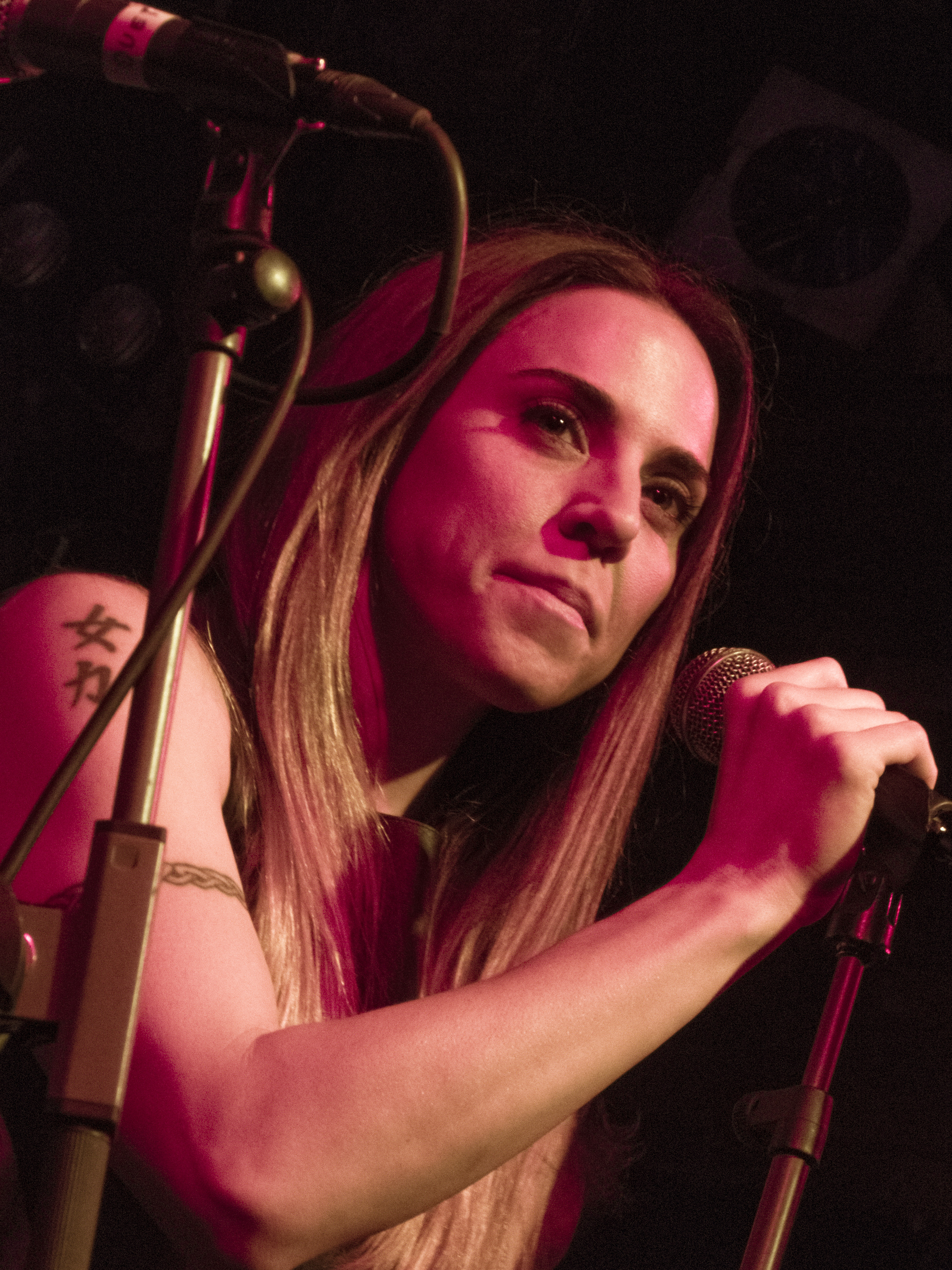
Melanie C

The following were the locations for the open ground auditions:

Date	City	Audition location	Ref.
September 27, 2014	Singapore	Basement 1, Sands Theatre, Marina Bay Sands	
September 28, 2014	Subang Jaya, Selangor, Malaysia	Taylor's University Lakeside Campus	
September 28, 2014	Pasay, Metro Manila, Philippines	SMX Convention Center, SM Mall of Asia	
October 5, 2014	Taipei, Taiwan	Legacy Taipei	

Auditionees were also allowed to submit their audition videos online via the show's official website.

Auditions in front of the judges (and a live audience) were held on January 13–14, 16–18, 20–22, 2015 at the Pinewood Iskandar Malaysia Studios in Johor, Malaysia. They would be screened across five episodes.

The judges' auditions also feature the Golden Buzzer. Each judge would have one chance to use the Golden Buzzer. The so-called Golden Acts, those on whom the Golden Buzzer is used, would automatically advance to the Semi-Finals. Wu was the first to press the Golden Buzzer on Japanese popping act Time Machine, followed by Melanie C on Chinese acrobat-dancer couple Gao Lin and Liu Xin and Anggun on Filipino shadow play group El Gamma Penumbra. Foster was the last judge to push the Golden Buzzer, using it on Filipina singer/soprano Gerphil Flores.

=== Auditions summary ===
Image	Golden Buzzer	Buzzed Out

==== Auditions 1 ====
Order	Name	Act	Buzzes				Result
Order	Name	Act	David	Anggun	Vanness	Melanie	Result
1	Junior New System	Dance Group					Advanced
2	Li Yongcong	Novelty Singer					Eliminated
3	Devon Woon	Martial Artist					Eliminated
4	Bar Flair Man	Bar Jugglers					Eliminated
5	Mildred Lopez	Actress					Eliminated
6	Gwyneth Dorado	Singer & Guitarist					Advanced
7	Ngo Minh Tu	Stunt Biker					Advanced
8	Ipe St	Fighting Act					Eliminated
9	Team Amazed	Multimedia Act					Eliminated
10	Tatueng Mong	Musicians					Advanced
11	AltType	Jump Ropers					Advanced
12	Nelson Tan	Musician					Eliminated
13	Yang Dae Yong	Pianist					Eliminated
14	Meow	Novelty Act					Eliminated
15	Gonzo	Tambourinist					Advanced
16	Kicky Han	Singer					Eliminated
17	Kelvin Lu Hee Wah	Singer					Eliminated
18	Pitupella	Vocal Group					Eliminated
19	Toshanbor Singh	Opera Singer					Advanced
20	Perassath Serval	Dancer					Eliminated
21	Elgi Augustian	Dancer					Eliminated
22	Time Machine	Dance Group			accepted		Advanced (Golden Buzzer: Van Ness Wu)
Number of buzzes per Judge			8 buzzes	8 buzzes	11 buzzes	9 buzzes	36 buzz / 88

==== Auditions 2 ====
Order	Name	Act	Buzzes				Result
Order	Name	Act	David	Anggun	Vanness	Melanie	Result
1	Madrid "Bong" Manifico	Singer					Eliminated
2	Chong Kah Yeen	Singer					Eliminated
3	Nguyen Kieu Anh	Singer					Eliminated
4	Oscar Chu	Harmonica Player					Advanced
5	Ra-L	Singer/Musician					Advanced
6	David	Magician					Eliminated
7	Shawn Chang	Ventriloquist & Magician					Advanced
8	Han Bok Hee	Singer					Advanced
9	Fe & Rodfil	Singing Duo					Advanced
10	Roy Payamal	Novelty Act					Eliminated
11	Primate	Beatboxers					Eliminated
12	Sandy Erlan	Suitcase Twirler					Eliminated
13	Gao Lin & Liu Xin	Acrobatic Dancers				accepted	Advanced (Golden Buzzer: Melanie Chisholm)
14	Suwanna Hong	Musicians					Advanced
15	Bir Khalsa	Sideshow Act					Eliminated
16	Khusugtun	Musicians					Advanced
17	Stefanos Koukas	Dancer					Advanced
18	Fitri Cerado	Singer & Pianist					Advanced
19	The Talento	Band					Advanced
Number of buzzes per Judge			6 buzzes	6 buzzes	5 buzzes	7 buzzes	24 buzz / 76

==== Auditions 3 ====
Order	Name	Act	Buzzes				Result
Order	Name	Act	David	Anggun	Vanness	Melanie	Result
1	Dance Thrilogy	Dance Group					Advanced
2	Angelico "Echo" Claridad	Singer					Advanced
3	Chiqaz	Dance Group					Advanced
4	Rachzonja	Drummer					Advanced
5	The Miss Tres	Singing Trio					Advanced
6	The Singing Magicians	Singers/Magicians					Eliminated
7	Lee Zoo	Juggler					Eliminated
8	Din	Guitarist					Eliminated
9	Nitish Bharti	Sand Artist					Advanced
10	Double Sisters	Singing Duo					Eliminated
11	Deenourmous	Drag Act					Eliminated
12	Fathin Amira	Singer					Advanced
13	Pa Ben & Lung Seng	Singing Duo					Eliminated
14	Skin & Bones	Acrobatic Duo					Eliminated
15	Mayuresh Mandhane	Stuntman					Eliminated
16	U Nyein Chan Aung	Sideshow Act					Eliminated
17	Bao Cuong	Sideshow Act					Advanced
18	A22	Sword Jugglers					Eliminated
19	Kin-Na-Ree-Nee-Tai	Acrobatic Group					Eliminated
19	KST Lion Dance Troupe	Lion Dance Troupe					Advanced
20	Avijit & Tinku	Acrobats					Advanced
21	Nhat Anh	Pole Dancer					Advanced
22	D'Intensity Breakers	Fire Dance Group					Advanced
Number of buzzes per Judge			4 buzzes	6 buzzes	4 buzzes	5 buzzes	19 buzz / 88

== Semifinals ==
The deliberation round was held at the Marina Bay Sands, the venue for the semifinals and finals. It was shown at end of the final auditions episode first aired on April 9, 2015. Wu was not physically present during the deliberation round, his input being relayed through Foster, who along with Anggun and Melanie C chose the 20 remaining acts who would compete in semi-finals. The four Golden Acts and the judges' picks would bring the total number of semifinalists to 24. The first eight semifinalists were announced after the deliberation round, with the others to be revealed gradually as the semifinal rounds progress.

While the voting is similar to other voting processes in the Got Talent franchise, the revelation of results would be slightly different, to be revealed in the following week rather than the next night (as semifinal rounds are only once weekly, barring replays). Also, in another twist, the Golden Buzzer returns wherein each semifinal round, the judges would use it as one unit to send one act straight to the finals. This is similar to the Judges' Choice in the other local franchises, albeit one ahead of the vote rather than after and based on the vote. Aside from the Judges' Choice through the Golden Buzzer, the two acts with the most public votes would also advance to the finals. There would thus be a total of nine finalists emerging from the three semifinal rounds.

Ages listed are as of the time of the auditions. In the case of group acts, the age ranges only accounted for the members present at the auditions. The age(s) of any additional member(s) who only appeared in the semifinal may or may not be within the range designated.

- Winner
- Runner-up
- Third place
- Fourth place
- Middle two
- Bottom three
- Auditions Golden Buzzer
- Semifinals Golden Buzzer

Name of act	Age(s)	Genre	Act	Hometown	Semifinal Week	Result
El Gamma Penumbra	22–40	Dance	Dance Group	Philippines	3	Winner
Khusugtun	25–38	Music	Musicians	Mongolia	2	Runner-up
Gerphil Geraldine Flores	24	Singing	Opera Singer	Philippines	2	Third place
The Talento	11–12	Singing	Band	Thailand	3	Fourth place
Junior New System	16–23	Dance	Dance Group	Philippines	2	Middle two
Triqstar	23–33	Dance	Dance Group	Japan	1	Middle two
Dance Thrilogy	8–12	Dance	Dance Group	Singapore	3	Bottom three
Gao Lin and Liu Xin	26 & 22	Acrobatics	Acrobat Duo	China	1	Bottom three
Gwyneth Dorado	10	Singing	Singer	Philippines	1	Bottom three
AltType	26–29	Variety	Jump Rope Team	Japan	3	Eliminated
Bảo Cường	23–35 (Note: The multiple ages accounted for Bảo Cường's age as well as those of his two assistants present at the time of his audition.)	Danger	Sideshow Act	Vietnam	2	Eliminated
Bebop	19–24	Singing	Band	South Korea	2	Eliminated
Billy Chang	31	Dance	Dancer	Taiwan	3	Eliminated
The Brothers	30–34	Singing	Opera Group	Indonesia	1	Eliminated
Fathin Amira	22	Singing	Singer	Singapore	2	Eliminated
Gonzo	29	Music	Tambourinist	Japan	1	Eliminated
Nitish Bharti	25	Variety	Sand Artist	India	1	Eliminated
Oscar Chu	18	Music	Harmonica Player	Taiwan	1	Eliminated
Sada Borneo	21–23	Music	Band	Malaysia	3	Eliminated
Sydney Uke	12	Music	Ukulele Player	Thailand	2	Eliminated
Time Machine	23–32	Dance	Dance Group	Japan	3	Eliminated
Toshanbor Singh Nongbet	23	Singing	Opera Singer	India	3	Eliminated
The Velasco Brothers	22–33	Dance	Dance Group	Philippines	1	Eliminated
Young Boys	14–24	Music	Comic piano Group	Indonesia	2	Eliminated

=== Semifinals summary ===
Image	Golden Buzzer	Buzzed Out

==== Semifinals 1: (April 16) ====
Order	Name	Buzzes				Result
Order	Name	David	Anggun	Vanness	Melanie	Result
1	Gonzo					Eliminated
2	Gwyneth Dorado					Advanced
3	Oscar Chu					Eliminated
4	Triqstar					Advanced
5	The Velasco Brothers					Eliminated
6	Nitish Bharti					Eliminated
7	Gao Lin & Liu Xin	accepted				Advanced (Golden Buzzer)
8	The Brothers					Eliminated
Number of buzzes per Judge		0 buzzes	0 buzzes	0 buzzes	0 buzzes	0 buzz / 32

==== Semifinals 2: (April 23) ====
Order	Name	Buzzes				Result
Order	Name	David	Anggun	Vanness	Melanie	Result
1	Young Boys					Eliminated
2	Gerphil Geraldine Flores					Advanced
3	Bebop					Eliminated
4	Khusugtun					Advanced
5	Bảo Cường					Eliminated
6	Sydney Uke					Eliminated
7	Fathin Amira					Eliminated
8	Junior New System	accepted				Advanced (Golden Buzzer)
Number of buzzes per Judge		1 buzz	1 buzz	0 buzzes	1 buzz	3 buzz / 32

==== Semifinals 3: (April 30) ====
Order	Name	Buzzes				Result
Order	Name	David	Anggun	Vanness	Melanie	Result
1	El Gamma Penumbra	accepted				Advanced (Golden Buzzer)
2	Dance Thrilogy					Advanced
3	Sada Borneo					Eliminated
4	AltType					Eliminated
5	The Talento					Advanced
6	Time Machine					Eliminated
7	Toshanbor Singh Nongbet					Eliminated
8	Billy Chang					Eliminated
Number of buzzes per Judge		2 buzzes	0 buzzes	1 buzz	1 buzz	4 buzz / 32

== Finals ==
The finals, like the semifinals, will be held at the Marina Bay Sands over a span of two episodes, a performance night and a results night. It is presumed that the final two public vote finalists from the third semifinal round would be present together the finalists who already advanced.

Charice and illusionist Cosentino (Australia's Got Talent season 5 runner-up) performed in the results night, Charice singing "Lay Me Down" with Foster on piano and Cosentino performing a metamorphosis/escape act involving a cage and spikes. Anggun also sang "Snow on the Sahara" before joining the rest of the judges in covering their own version of "Let's Groove" by Earth, Wind & Fire.

Order	Finalist	Act	Finished
1	The Talento	Singer	Fourth place
2	Gao Lin and Liu Xin	Acrobatic Dancers	Bottom three
3	Gwyneth Dorado	Singer	Bottom three
4	Dance Thrilogy	Dance Group	Bottom three
5	Khusugtun	Mongolian Throat Singers	Runner-up
6	Triqstar	Dance Group	Middle two
7	El Gamma Penumbra	Shadow Dancers	Winner
8	Gerphil Geraldine Flores	Singer	Third place
9	Junior New System	Dance Group	Middle two

== Contestants who appeared on previous shows or seasons ==
- El Gamma Penumbra, the winner of the first season, placed fourth on the third season of Pilipinas Got Talent.
- Gerphil Flores, the third placer of this season, was a semifinalist of the premiere season of Pilipinas Got Talent.
- The Velasco Brothers, a semifinalist, placed third on the first season of Pilipinas Got Talent.
- The Miss Tres was a semifinalist on the fourth season of Pilipinas Got Talent.
- Symmetry was also a semifinalist on the fourth season of Pilipinas Got Talent.
- Angelico "Echo" Claridad joined the first season of The Voice Kids in the Philippines. He turned all three chairs and joined Team Lea, but was eliminated in the Battles.
- Jeremiah Velasco auditioned in all five seasons of Pilipinas Got Talent. In his fifth season audition, he mentioned in front of the judges that he also auditioned on Asia's Got Talent. His audition was not aired.
- The Talento competed in the fourth season of Thailand's Got Talent, reaching the finals.
- Ira Christy Pitaloka, Rachzonja Adhy Kirana Putra, Ni Luh Ayu Leny, The Blessing, Helen Renata Gunawan, Ari Wibowo, and Rifki Ardiansyah all appeared in the second season of Indonesia's Got Talent while Djitron Pah and Young Boys appeared as semifinalists in the first.
- Han Bok Hee auditioned on the second season of Korea's Got Talent, singing "Non, je ne regrette rien" by Edith Piaf, the same audition piece she used in this season.
- Bảo Cường and Nguyễn Thị Huyền Trang were semifinalists on the 2012 season of Vietnam's Got Talent.
- Neil Rey Garcia Llanes won the 2014 edition of the talent show Talentadong Pinoy.
- Roadfill Macasero of Fe and Roadfill is already known in the Philippines as one-half of a comic and song duo Moymoy Palaboy, the other half being his older brother and group namesake Moymoy.
- Indian martial arts group Bir Khalsa placed third in the second season of India's Got Talent. They also appeared in the third season of the joint Czech-Slovak franchise Česko Slovensko má talent; their audition there and their audition in this season both did not result in their favor.
