= Gwyn Dorado =

Filipino singer (born 2004)

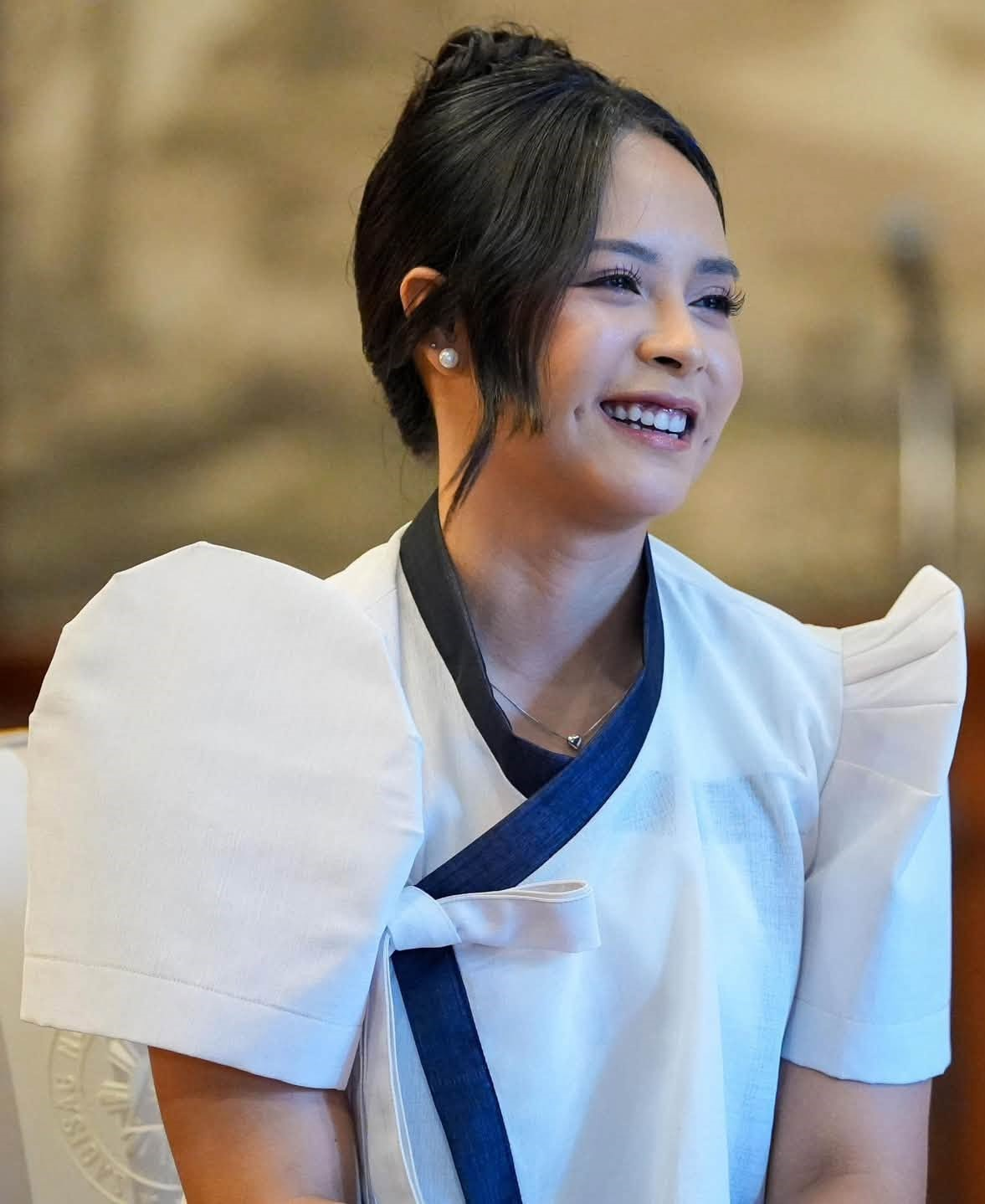
- Dorado in 2026

Background information
- Born: Gwyneth Jearei Dorado; December 10, 2004 (age 21); Antipolo, Rizal, Philippines
- Genres: Pop; ballad
- Occupations: Singer; songwriter
- Years active: 2015–present
- Label: A.O. Entertainment

Gwyneth Jearei "Gwyn" Dorado (born December 10, 2004) is a Filipino singer and songwriter. She rose to fame as a finalist on the first season of Asia's Got Talent (2015) and as the runner-up of the fourth season of the South Korean singing competition show Sing Again (2025–2026).

== Early life and career ==
Gwyneth Jearei Dorado was born on December 10, 2004 in Antipolo, Rizal. She started playing the guitar from a young age, and had been involved in musical theatre productions like Annie and The Sound of Music. She finished Senior High School at the University of Santo Tomas High School in Manila under the Music, Arts, and Design program.

In 2015, at the age of 10, she successfully auditioned for Asia's Got Talent season 1. After performing a cover of Katy Perry's "Roar" and a host of other music numbers, she reached the grand finale and ended in the Top 5 finalists.

Dorado began releasing her original work and soundtrack songs around 2008. In 2022, she released "Tulala" as a digital single in the Philippines under the name Gwyneth Dorado, followed by other singles, under the name Gwyn Dorado.

== Career in South Korea ==
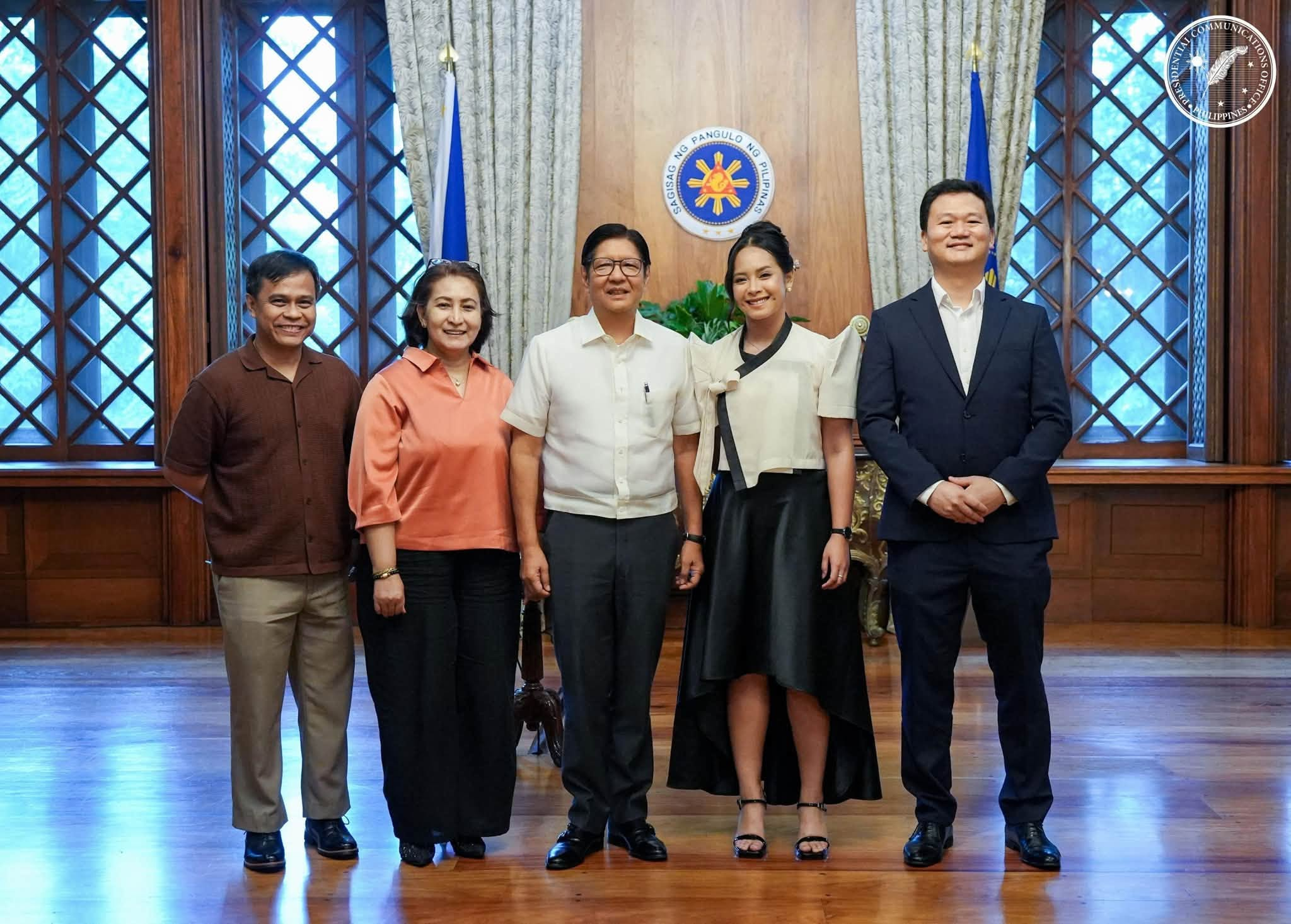
Dorado (second from the right) and her parents (left) with Philippine President Bongbong Marcos (center) at Malacañang Palace, Manila, in 2026

In 2024, Dorado signed a contract with the South Korean agency A.O. Entertainment. She released the digital single "Way" in 2025 as her South Korean debut and contributed the track "What If" as an original soundtrack for the program ToGetHer.

She participated in the fourth season of the competition show Sing Again (2025–2026) on JTBC as "Singer No. 59" and was the only non-Korean contestant to reach the final stage, securing second place after Lee Oh-wook.

In 2026, Dorado won the Netflix Korea program Famous Singers Need a Hit Song. She has also recorded original soundtrack songs for Korean dramas, including "Losing My Heart" for My Royal Nemesis (2026).

== Personal life ==
Dorado has been residing in South Korea since 2024. Aside from her native Tagalog, she is fluent in English and Korean.

== Discography ==
=== Digital singles ===
- "Tulala" (2022)
- "Why Do We Love?" (2023)
- "Way" (2025)

=== Soundtrack appearances ===
- "What If" (ToGetHer)
- "Losing My Heart" (My Royal Nemesis, 2026)
