= Sing Again =

2020–2025 South Korean television show

- Season 4 promotional poster
- Hangul: 싱어게인 - 무명가수전
- RR: Sing eogein - mumyeong gasujeon
- MR: Sing ŏgein - mumyŏng kasujŏn
- Genre: Reality show
- Directed by: Yoon Hyun-joon
- Presented by: Lee Seung-gi
- Country of origin: South Korea
- Original language: Korean
- No. of seasons: 4
- No. of episodes: 50 + 1 special

Production
- Production location: South Korea
- Running time: 80 minutes

Original release
- Network: JTBC
- Release: November 16, 2020

Sing Again (Korean: 싱어게인 - 무명가수전) is a South Korean television program that aired on JTBC starting November 16, 2020. Season 1 aired at 22:30 (KST) on Monday.

Season 2, starting on December 6, 2021, aired at 21:00 (KST) every Monday. Season 3, starting on October 26, 2023, aired at 22:00 (KST) every Thursday. Season 4, starting on October 14, 2025, aired at 22:30 (KST) every Tuesday.

All seasons have been hosted by Lee Seung-gi.

== Overview ==
The show features unknown singers, artists whose past careers were brief, and performers who have not previously debuted, offering contestants an opportunity to perform.

== Judges and MC ==
Position	Name		Occupation
Position	Rom.	Hangul	Occupation
MC	Lee Seung-gi (Note: Main presenter/host.)	이승기	Singer, actor, host, entertainer
Current Senior Judges	Yoon Jong-shin (Note: He served as stand-in for Hee-yeol in Season 2, who was unable to attend due to illness. He became a senior judge in season 3.)	윤종신	Singer-songwriter, record producer
Current Senior Judges	Yim Jae-beom	임재범	Singer-songwriter
Current Senior Judges	Baek Ji-young	백지영	Singer
Current Senior Judges	Kim Eana	김이나	Lyricist, songwriter
Current Junior Judges	Lee Hae-ri	이해리	Member of Davichi, musical actress
Current Junior Judges	Kyuhyun	규현	Member of Super Junior, host, musical actor
Current Junior Judges	Taeyeon	태연	Singer, Member of Girls' Generation
Current Junior Judges	Code Kunst	코드 쿤스트	Composer, rapper, producer
Previous Judges	You Hee-yeol (Note: Senior judge in seasons 1–2.)	유희열	Singer, host, composer, producer
Previous Judges	Jeon In-kwon (Note: He only appeared in episodes 1–2 of season 1 because of the tight filming schedule.)	전인권	Singer, songwriter
Previous Judges	Kim Jong-jin (Note: Replaced Jeon as senior judge in season 1.)	김종진	Singer, actor
Previous Judges	Lee Sun-hee	이선희	Singer-songwriter
Previous Judges	Yoon Do-hyun (Note: Senior judge in season 2.)	윤도현	Singer, musician, songwriter
Previous Judges	Song Min-ho (Note: Junior judge in seasons 1–2)	송민호	Member of Winner, lyricist, composer
Previous Judges	Sunmi (Note: Junior judge in seasons 1–3)	선미	Former member of Wonder Girls, Singer, songwriter, lyricist

== Series overview ==
Series	No. of episodes	Originally Aired		Winner	Runner-up	Third place	Ref.
Series	No. of episodes	First Aired	Last Aired	Winner	Runner-up	Third place	Ref.
1	12	16 November 2020	15 February 2021	Lee Seung-yoon 이승윤	Jeong Hongil 정홍일	Lee Mu-jin 이무진	
2	12	6 December 2021	28 February 2022	Kim Ki-tae 김기태	Kim So-yeon 김소연	Yun Sung 윤성	
3	13	26 October 2023	18 January 2024	Hong Isaac 이삭홍	So Soo-bin 소수빈	Jang Eun-jung (EJel) 장은정	
4	13	14 October 2025	6 January 2026	Lee Oh-wook 이오욱	Dorado 도라도	Kim Jae-min 김재민	

== Ratings ==
Sing Again : South Korea viewers per episode (millions)

Season	Episode number													Average
Season	1	2	3	4	5	6	7	8	9	10	11	12	13	Average
1	0.715	1.376	1.658	1.657	1.806	1.770	1.515	1.984	2.016	2.059	2.318	2.442	–	1.776
2	1.215	1.582	1.729	1.816	1.820	1.750	1.788	1.921	1.869	1.449	2.025	1.976	–	1.794
3	0.998	1.424	1.607	1.543	1.546	1.506	1.543	N/A	1.323	1.362	1.460	1.546	1.577	N/A
4	0.907	0.991	0.850	0.729	0.839	0.791	0.803	0.801	0.933	0.829	0.730	0.752	0.848	N/A

Source: Audience measurement performed nationwide by Nielsen Media Research.

=== Season 1: 2020–2021 ===
In the ratings below, the lowest rating for the show will be in blue and the highest rating for the show will be in red.

Ep. #	Broadcast Date	Average audience share (AGB Nielsen)	
Ep. #	Broadcast Date	Nationwide	Seoul
1	November 16, 2020	3.165%	3.570%
2	November 23, 2020	5.416%	5.575%
3	November 30, 2020	7.131%	7.762%
4	December 7, 2020	6.914%	8.215%
5	December 14, 2020	7.545%	8.884%
6	December 21, 2020	7.248%	8.115%
7	January 4, 2021	6.241%	7.382%
8	January 11, 2021	8.450%	9.451%
9	January 18, 2021	8.221%	9.027%
10	January 25, 2021	8.516%	9.437%
11	February 1, 2021	10.062%	11.753%
12	February 8, 2021	10.010%	11.591%
Average		7.410%	8.397%
Specials
13	February 15, 2021	4.880%	5.997%

=== Season 2: 2021–2022 ===
In the ratings below, the lowest rating for the show will be in blue and the highest rating for the show will be in red.

Ep.	Broadcast Date	Average audience share (AGB Nielsen)	
Ep.	Broadcast Date	Nationwide	Seoul
1	December 6, 2021	5.556%	6.120%
2	December 13, 2021	6.922%	7.795%
3	December 20, 2021	7.811%	8.683%
4	December 27, 2021	7.752%	8.891%
5	January 3, 2022	8.000%	9.138%
6	January 10, 2022	7.599%	8.804%
7	January 17, 2022	7.600%	8.335%
8	January 24, 2022	8.126%	8.865%
9	February 7, 2022	7.889%	9.285%
10	February 14, 2022	6.609%	7.153%
11	February 21, 2022	8.507%	9.849%
12	February 28, 2022	8.659%	9.514%
Average		7.586%	8.536%

=== Season 3: 2023–2024 ===
In the ratings below, the lowest rating for the show will be in blue and the highest rating for the show will be in red.

Ep.	Broadcast Date	Average audience share (AGB Nielsen)	
Ep.	Broadcast Date	Nationwide	Seoul
1	October 26, 2023	4.826%	4.558%
2	November 2, 2023	6.703%	6.346%
3	November 9, 2023	7.265%	7.127%
4	November 16, 2023	6.756%	6.742%
5	November 23, 2023	7.132%	7.830%
6	November 30, 2023	7.168%	7.774%
7	December 7, 2023	7.274%	7.860%
8	December 14, 2023	7.851%	8.500%
9	December 21, 2023	6.296%	6.930%
10	December 28, 2023	6.027%	6.363%
11	January 4, 2024	6.952%	7.260%
12	January 11, 2024	6.820%	7.444%
13	January 18, 2024	7.287%	7.557%
Average		6.776%	7.099%

=== Season 4: 2025–2026 ===
In the ratings below, the lowest rating for the show will be in blue and the highest rating for the show will be in red.

Ep.	Broadcast date	Average audience share (AGB Nielsen)	
Ep.	Broadcast date	Nationwide	Seoul
1	October 14, 2025	3.612%	3.673%
2	October 21, 2025	3.780%	4.270%
3	October 28, 2025	3.729%	4.121%
4	November 4, 2025	3.252%	3.476%
5	November 11, 2025	3.381%	3.406%
6	November 18, 2025	3.548%	3.695%
7	November 25, 2025	3.453%	3.462%
8	December 2, 2025	3.360%	3.543%
9	December 9, 2025	3.916%	4.066%
10	December 16, 2025	3.404%	3.613%
11	December 23, 2025	3.159%	3.078%
12	December 30, 2025	3.041%	3.224%
13	January 6, 2026	3.450%	3.789%
Average		3.469%	3.647%

Note: This show airs on a cable channel/pay TV which normally has a relatively smaller audience compared to free-to-air TV/public broadcasters (KBS, SBS, MBC & EBS).

== Spin-offs ==
=== Famous Singer (2021) ===
Famous Singer (유명가수전) is a Sing Again spin-off program that runs from April 2, 2021 – June 22, 2021. It features the Top 3 contestants from Sing Again season 1.
On the new program, the Top 3 finalists include winner Lee Seung-yoon, runner-up Jeong Hong Il, and third-place contestant Lee Mu-jin, will be meeting with Korea's legendary singers to talk about music and perform covers and collaborations.

=== Famous Singers and Street Judges (2024) ===
Famous Singers and Street Judges (유명가수와 길거리 심사단) is the second spin-off program from Sing Again that runs from March 6, 2024. It features the Top 7 contestants from Sing Again season 3.
On the new program, the Top 7 contestants will leave the confines of the competition venue to tour the country, engaging in a novel road busking music show with a panel of street judges from various genders and generations.
