= Yang Yeon-je =

South Korean singer (born 1999)

- 양연제
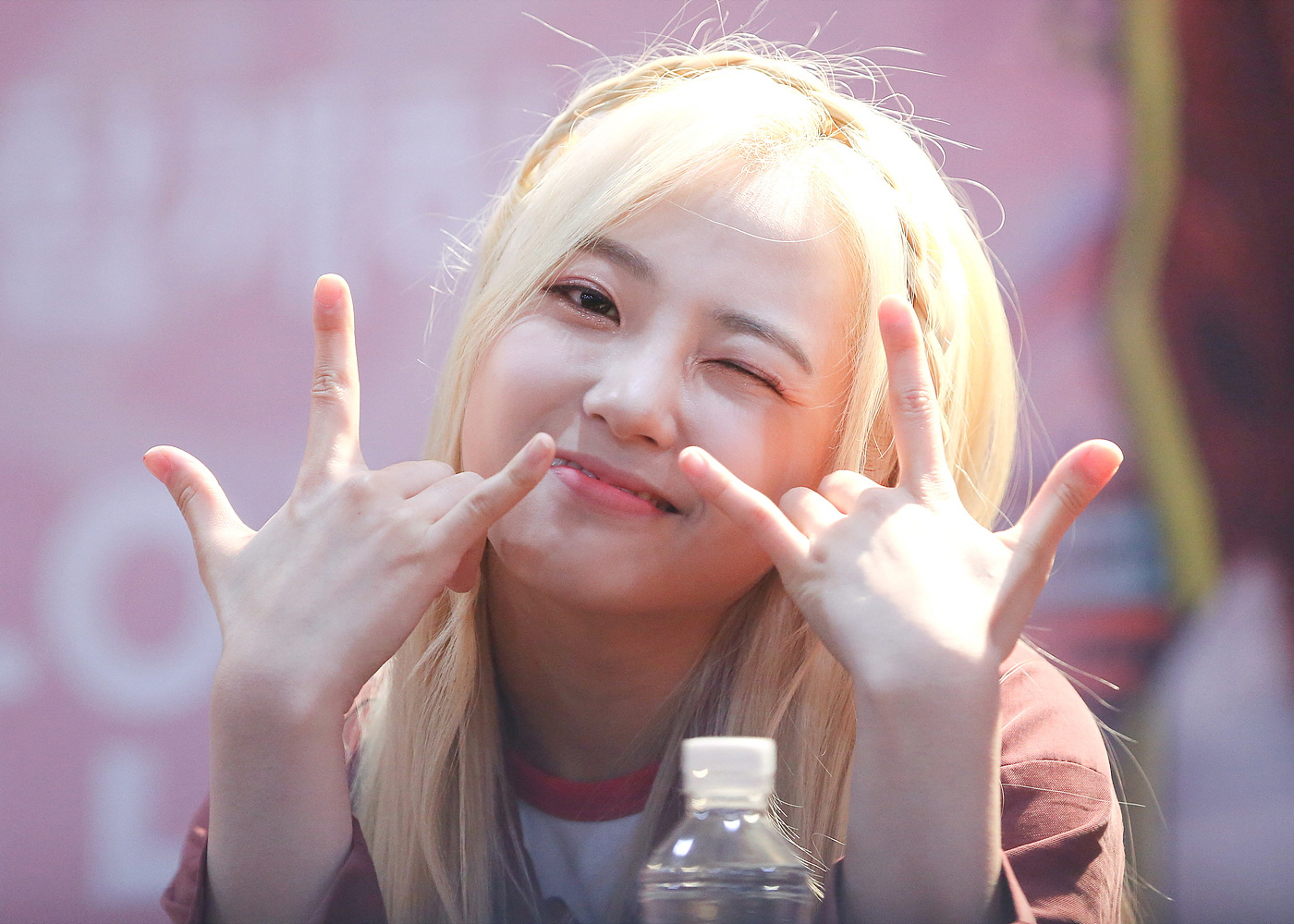
- Yeonje promoting with Alice in October 2017
- Born: Yang Hye-sun; October 15, 1999 (age 27); Gwangju, South Korea
- Education: Hanlim Multi Art School
- Occupations: Singer; dancer
- Musical career
- Genre: K-pop
- Years active: 2017–present
- Labels: Hunus; IOK Company
- Member of: Alice

Korean name
- Hangul: 양연제
- Hanja: 梁娫提
- RR: Yang Yeonje
- MR: Yang Yŏnje

Former name
- Hangul: 양혜선
- Hanja: 梁惠善
- RR: Yang Hyeseon
- MR: Yang Hyesŏn

Yang Yeon-je (Korean: 양연제, born Yang Hye-sun [양혜선]; October 15, 1999), also known by her stage name Yeonje and formerly Hyeseong, is a South Korean singer and dancer under IOK Company. She debuted as a member of Alice (then known as Elris) in 2017 under the stage name Hyeseong. She debuted as musical actress in the musical "Hello Jadoo" as Lee Eunhee in 2018.

== Early life ==
Yeonje was born as Yang Hye-sun on October 15, 1999, in Gwangju, South Korea. Her family consists of herself, her parents and one younger sister. Yeonje studied at Hanlim Multi Art School.

== History ==
=== Pre-debut ===
Yeonje appeared on Romeo's music video "Target" on November 4, 2015. She also appeared in a chicken CF with IU.

=== 2017–present: Debut with Alice, Musical Theater Debut, OST ===
On June 1, 2017, Yeonje officially debuted with Elris with the release of their 1st mini album We, First. In September 2017, Yeonje auditioned for JTBC's reality show Mix Nine; she passed the audition stage making it onto the show. Yeonje was eliminated in ep 10, ranking 43 out of the girls ranking.

In June 2018, Yeonje was cast in the musical "Hello Jadoo" as Lee Eunhee. On June 2, 2018, Yeonje released the OST "Single Heart" for the drama "Rich Man" with groupmate Do-A.

On April 11, 2022, after Elris rebranded to Alice, she changed her stage name from Hyeseong to Yeonje.

== Discography ==
=== Singles ===
Title	Year	Peak chart position	Sales	Album
Title	Year	KOR Gaon	Sales	Album
Soundtrack appearances
"Single Heart" (니가 없는 난) (with Bella of Alice)	2018	—N/a	—N/a	Rich Man OST Part.4
"—" denotes releases that did not chart or were not released in that region.

== Filmography ==
=== Variety shows ===
Year	Title	Notes/Ref.
2017–2018	Mix Nine	Contestant

=== Television shows ===
Year	Title	Role	Notes/Ref.
2020	Strange School Tales	Song Hae-joo	episode: "The Child Who Wouldn't Come"

== Musicals ==
Year	Title	Role	Notes/Ref.
2018	Hello Jadoo	Lee Eun-hee	Supporting role
