= K-pop Star 6: The Last Chance =

- Season 6
- Hosted by: Jun Hyun-moo; Boom; Akdong Musician
- Judges: Park Jin-young; Yang Hyun-suk; You Hee-yeol
- Winner: Boyfriend
- Runner-up: KWINs
- Finals venue: Bucheon Gymnasium

Release
- Original release: November 20, 2016 – April 9, 2017

Season chronology
- ← Previous; K-pop Star 5

The sixth and final season of the South Korean reality television competition show K-pop Star, also branded as K-pop Star 6: The Last Chance, that premiered in SBS on November 20, 2016, until April 9, 2017. It aired every Sunday evenings as part of the Good Sunday lineup. Yang Hyun-suk, Park Jin-young, and You Hee-yeol will return as judges.

Changes to the format have been made to the final season, with restrictions lifted for potential contestants to encourage anyone to participate in "the last chance" to become a K-pop Star. Existing trainees of companies as well as singers who have already debuted are allowed to participate. The winner of the final season will not choose which company to debut with, but instead will be jointly debuted and promoted by all three companies (YG, JYP, Antenna).

== Process ==
- Audition applications + Preliminary auditions (June - August 2016)

== Judges ==
- Yang Hyun-suk (YG Entertainment) – Producer, singer
- Park Jin-young (JYP Entertainment) – Executive producer, producer, singer, songwriter
- You Hee-yeol (Antenna Music) – Singer, pianist

== Casting Audition ==
=== Agency Casting Result ===
Remarks	JYP	YG	Antenna
Vocalists	Seok Ji-soo	Shannon	Lee Sung-eun
Vocalists	Kim Yoon-hee	Woo Nyeong-in	Kim Joo-eun
Vocalists	Boyfriend (Park Hyun-jin, Kim Jong-seob)	Ma Eun-jin	Ji Woo-jin
Vocalists	Han Byeol	Yoo Ji-ni	Lee Ga-young
Vocalists	Sung Yoo-jin	Lee Seo-jin	Baek Seon-nyeo
Trainees contestant	Lee Soo-min	Go A-ra	—N/a
Trainees contestant	Jeon Min-joo	Kriesha Chu	—N/a
Trainees contestant	Kim So-hee	Kim Hye-rim	—N/a

=== List of Contestants ===
==== JYP ====
- Kim Yoon-hee (born in 2002) (former participant of Fantastic Duo season 1 episodes 27–30, duet with Lee Moon-se)
- Seok Ji-soo (born in 1999) (former participant of Fantastic Duo season 1 episodes 29–30, duet with K.Will)
- Sung Yoo-jin (born in 1992) (formerly part of The SeeYa)
- Han Byeol (born in 2006)
- Boyfriend, signed with YG Entertainment but Park Hyun-jin left YG and join Starship Entertainment
  - Park Hyun-jin (born in 2005), signed with Starship Entertainment
  - Kim Jong-seob (born in 2005), signed with YG Entertainment (Debut in P1Harmony, under FNC Entertainment)
- Trainee contestants (JYP Once)
  - Kim So-hee (born in 1999) (Debut in Alice, under IOK Entertainment)
  - Jeon Min-joo (born in 1994) (formerly part of The Ark, K-pop Star 2 contestant, debuted as duo Khan under Maroo Entertainment)
  - Lee Soo-min (born in 1999) (Produce 101 participant, former Fantagio trainee, signed with Loen Entertainment)

==== YG ====
- Shannon (born in 1998) (was in MBK Entertainment)
- Woo Nyeong-in (born in 1997)
- Ma Eun-jin (born in 1997) (Produce 101 participant, Coridel Entertainment, added to Playback)
- Yoo Ji-ni (born in 2003)
- Lee Seo-jin (born in 1996) (former participant of Fantastic Duo season 1, duet with Taeyang on episodes 1–2, then duet with Kim Tae-woo on special episode 23)
- Trainee contestants (YG Girls)
  - Go A-ra (born in 2001) (Debut in Favorite, under Astory Entertainment)
  - Kriesha Chu (born in 1998) (Urban Works Entertainment, solo debut)
  - Kim Hye-rim (born in 1999) (solo debut)

==== Antenna ====
- Lee Sung-eun (born in 2001)
- Kim Joo-eun (born in 1995)
- Ji Woo-jin (born in 1990)
- Lee Ga-young (born in 1999)
- Baek Seon-nyeo (born in 1994)

== Battle Audition ==
Contestants represent the company they were cast to in a 1 to 1 to 1 battle. First place automatically gets to be in the Top 10, while 3rd place is eliminated. Contestants who finish in 2nd place battle the other contestants who finished 2nd place. Anyone who does not get in the Top 10 teams/contestants is eliminated. For trainees, the winner team advances to Top 10 and lose team joined other contestants in 2nd place for rematch individually.

Group	1st Place (Top 10)	2nd (Rematch)	3rd (Eliminated)
A	Boyfriend (Park Hyun-jin, Kim Jong-seob)	Shannon	Lee Ga-young
B	Lee Seo-jin	Baek Seon-nyeo, Han Byeol	None
C	Seok Ji-soo	Lee Sung-eun	Woo Nyeong-in
D	Kim Yoon-hee	Ma Eun-jin	Kim Joo-eun
E	None	Yoo Ji-ni, Sung Yoo-jin	Ji Woo-jin
Trainees	YG Girls (Go A-ra, Kriesha Chu, Kim Hye-rim)	JYP Once (Kim So-hee, Jeon Min-joo, Lee Soo-min)	None

=== Top 10 Rematch ===
Name	Result
Ma Eunjin	Advanced to Top 10
Lee Soo-min	Advanced to Top 10
Jeon Min-joo	Advanced to Top 10
Kim So-hee	Advanced to Top 10
Yoo Ji-ni	Advanced to Top 10
Shannon	Advanced to Top 10 (JYP priority card)
Lee Sung-eun	Eliminated
Han Byeol	Eliminated
Baek Seon-nyeo	Eliminated
Sung Yoo-jin	Eliminated

== Stage Auditions ==
- For the Top 8 Finals, the Top 10 competed in two groups on stage with the results determined by the judges. The top three contestants from each group were chosen to proceed to the next round.
  - The Top 8, who proceeded to the live stage, were determined by the three judges as well as a 100-member Audience Judging Panel. The last two contestants from each group became Elimination Candidates, with the Audience Judging Panel voting for their preferred act. The two acts with the most votes from the four Elimination Candidates proceeded to the Top 8, with the other two contestants eliminated.

Episode #	Group	Order	Name	Song – Original Artist	Rank	Result
Top 8 Finals (Feb 28 & March 6)
15	A	1	Lee Seo-jin	The Greatest Love of All – Whitney Houston	Elimination Candidate	Eliminated
15	A	2	Jeon Min-joo & Kriesha Tiu	날개 (Wings) (Korean Ver.) – Little Mix/ (BO$$) – Fifth Harmony	3rd	Top 8
15	A	3	Shannon	어머님이 누구니 (Who's You Mama?) – Park Jin-young	1st	Top 8
15	A	4	Kim Hye-rim & Go A-ra	Touch Down – Twice	2nd	Top 8
15	A	5	Yoo Ji-ni	Rose – Lee Hi	Elimination Candidate	Eliminated
16	B	1	Boyfriend	Turn Up The Music – Chris Brown	1st	Top 8
16	B	2	Seok Ji-soo	Don't You Worry 'Bout A Thing	Elimination Candidate	Top 8
16	B	3	Ma Eun-jin	Loving U	Elimination Candidate	Top 8
16	B	4	Kim Yoon-hee	If You Give Your Heart	3rd	Top 8
16	B	5	Lee Soo-min & Kim So-hee	The Boys – Girls' Generation	2nd	Top 8

- The Top 8 competes 1:1 on the live stage with the results determined by the judges. One contestant from each group is chosen to proceed to the next round.
- The contestants not chosen will go through voting by 100 citizen judges, where the three top contestants will proceed to the next round.

Episode	Group	Order	Name	Song – Original Artist	Judges Decision			Rematch	Result
Episode	Group	Order	Name	Song – Original Artist	JYP	YG	Antenna	Rematch	Result
Top 8 Finals (March 12, March 19)
17 & 18	1	1	Shannon	See Through – Primary (feat Gaeko, Zion.T)	Jeon Min-joo & Kriesha Tiu	Shannon	Jeon Min-joo & Kriesha Tiu	Shannon	Top 6
17 & 18	1	2	Jeon Min-joo & Kriesha Tiu	Crazy in Love – Beyoncé	Jeon Min-joo & Kriesha Tiu	Shannon	Jeon Min-joo & Kriesha Tiu	N/A	Top 6
17 & 18	2	1	Kim Hye-rim & Go A-ra	I'm In Love With a Monster – Fifth Harmony	Kim Hye-rim & Go A-ra	Kim Hye-rim & Go A-ra	Kim Hye-rim & Go A-ra	N/A	Top 6
17 & 18	2	2	Ma Eun-jin	Sometimes – Crush	Kim Hye-rim & Go A-ra	Kim Hye-rim & Go A-ra	Kim Hye-rim & Go A-ra	Ma Eun-jin	Eliminated
17 & 18	3	1	Lee Soo-min & Kim So-hee	2 Different Tears – Wonder Girls	Lee Soo-min & Kim So-hee	Lee Soo-min & Kim So-hee	Boyfriend	N/A	Top 6
17 & 18	3	2	Boyfriend	Step by Step – New Kids On the Block	Lee Soo-min & Kim So-hee	Lee Soo-min & Kim So-hee	Boyfriend	Boyfriend	Top 6
17 & 18	4	1	Seok Ji-soo	같은 시간 속의 너 (You From The Same Time) - Naul	Kim Yoon-hee	Kim Yoon-hee	Kim Yoon-hee	N/A	Top 6
17 & 18	4	2	Kim Yoon-hee	Like Yesterday - J.ae	Kim Yoon-hee	Kim Yoon-hee	Kim Yoon-hee	Seok Ji-soo	Top 6

- Trainee contestants is reform into two girl groups (each group contains 3 people).
- For the Top 6, Top 4 and Finals, the judges and viewers' scores were weighted 60:40, and were combined to eliminate the contestant with the lowest score.

Episode	Order	Name	Song – Original Artist	Judges Score			Result
Episode	Order	Name	Song – Original Artist	JYP	YG	Antenna	Result
Top 6 (March 26)
19	1	Seok Ji-soo	Baby Baby - Jo Kyu Chan	94	88	94	Eliminated
19	2	Shannon	Happy - Pharrell Williams	90	97	94	Top 4
19	3	Jeon Min-joo, Go A-ra, Lee Soo-min (Minari)	Runaway Baby - Bruno Mars	88	90	95	Top 4
19	4	Kim So-hee, Kriesha Tiu, Kim Hye-rim (KWINs)	Swing Baby - Park Jin-young	98	97	97	Top 4
19	5	Kim Yoon-hee	Goodbye Sadness, Hello Happiness - Yoon Mi-rae	88	93	93	Eliminated
19	6	Boyfriend	Her - Block B	90	92	91	Top 4
Top 4 (April 2)
20	1	Shannon	I Have A Girlfriend - Park Jin-young	92	90	95	Eliminated
20	2	Jeon Min-joo, Go A-ra, Lee Soo-min (Minari)	Something - Girl's Day	93	92	92	Eliminated
20	3	Boyfriend	Let's Get It Started - Black Eyed Peas	96	99	100	Top 2
20	4	Kim So-hee, Kriesha Tiu, Kim Hye-rim (KWINs)	Wannabe - Spice Girls	92	92	96	Top 2
Finals
21	Round 1						
21	1	Kim So-hee, Kriesha Tiu, Kim Hye-rim (KWINs)	Troublemaker - Hyuna & Hyunseung	96	97	96	-
21	2	Boyfriend	Crooked - G-Dragon	93	95	97	-
21	Round 2: Song Previously Sung by Opponent						
21	1	Kim So-hee, Kriesha Tiu, Kim Hye-rim (KWINs)	Thriller - Michael Jackson	91	90	94	Runner-Up
21	2	Boyfriend	Swing Baby - Park Jin-young	98	100	99	Winner
