= Institute of Culture =

Institute of Culture may refer to:

- International institute of culture, Vienna, Austria
- Belarusian Institute of Culture
- Minsk Institute of Culture, Belarus
  - Institute of Culture (Minsk Metro), a Minsk metro station
- Bogotan Institute of Culture, Colombia; see Juan B. Gutiérrez
- Colombian Institute of Culture, Bogotá
- Ramakrishna Mission Institute of Culture, Golpark, Kolkata, India
- Sri Aurobindo Institute of Culture, Kolkata, India; see The Future Foundation School, Kolkata
- Italian Institute of Culture
- Leningrad State Institute of Culture
- National Institute of Culture of Panama, fictional, see Quantum of Solace
- Nicaraguan Institute of Culture, see Government of Nicaragua
- National Institute of Culture, Peru
- Małopolska Institute of Culture, Poland
- Altai State Institute of Culture, see Education in Siberia, Russia
- Moscow Institute of Culture, Russia
- Kyiv State Institute of Culture, Ukraine
- Puerto Rican Institute of Culture, San Juan, Puerto Rico, U.S.
- Tashkent State Institute of Culture, Uzbekistan
