= Kim So-hee (singer, born 1999) =

South Korean singer (born 1999)

- Kim promoting with Alice in October 2017
- Born: December 31, 1999 (age 26); Incheon, South Korea
- Occupation: Singer
- Spouse: Unknown (m. 2024)
- Children: 1
- Musical career
- Genre: K-pop
- Instrument: Vocals
- Years active: 2016–2024
- Labels: Hunus; IOK Company
- Formerly of: Alice

Korean name
- Hangul: 김소희
- Hanja: 金昭喜
- RR: Gim Sohui
- MR: Kim Sohŭi

Kim So-hee (Korean: 김소희; born December 31, 1999) is a South Korean former singer. She is known for being a contestant of K-pop Star 6: The Last Chance, in which she emerged as runner-up as a member of KWINs. She debuted as a solo artist on May 21, 2017 and on June 1, 2017, she debuted as a member of Alice. On April 26, 2024, Sohee left Alice and retired from the entertainment industry.

== Career ==
=== 2016: Pre-debut and K-pop Star 6 ===
Kim participated in K-pop Star 6: The Last Chance in 2016 as a trainee promoted by JYP Entertainment. As part of KWINs, which also consisted of Kriesha Tiu and Kim Hye-rim, she emerged as the first runner-up.

=== 2017–2024: Solo debut, debut with Alice and retirement from entertainment industry ===
On May 19, 2017, Kim made her solo debut with the single "Spotlight". Kim made her debut with Alice on June 1, in which they released their first mini-album, We, First. On December 6, she collaborated with Topp Dogg and JBJ's Kim Sang-gyun (A-Tom) on the duet "Childlike", which was produced by BtoB's Lee Min-hyuk.

In February 2022, Kim cast for TVING's sci-fi thriller, Duty After School based on the webtoon of the same name.

== Personal life ==
=== Marriage and retirement ===
On April 26, 2024, Kim's agency, IOK Company, confirmed that she would marry a businessman 15 years older than her, whom she's been dating for a year, and announced that she would be retiring from the entertainment industry. On March 30, 2026, Kim revealed in a post on her personal Instagram account that she had given birth to her first child, a daughter. The specific date of birth was not disclosed.

== Discography ==
=== Singles ===
Title	Year	Peak chart positions	Album
Title	Year	KOR BGM	Album
"Spotlight"	2017	—	Non-album singles
"Childlike" (유치해도) (with Kim Sang-gyun)	2017	—	Non-album singles
"Hurry Up" (feat. Bolbbalgan4)	2018	100	Non-album singles
"YOYO" (feat. Xinsayne)	2023	—	Non-album singles
"—" denotes releases that did not chart or were not released in that region.

=== Soundtrack appearances ===
Title	Year	Peak chart positions	Album
Title	Year	KOR BGM	Album
"That Can't Happen" (그럴리가 없는데)	2018	—	No Bad Days 2 OST
"Tears"	2018	—	My Healing Love OST
"Dr.Dream"	2019	—	Best Chicken OST
"Where I Meet Her 100 Meters Ago" (그녀를 만나는 곳 100M 전)	2020	87	Homemade Love Story OST
"Dream" (이런 상상)	2020	—	Do Do Sol Sol La La Sol OST
"Love X Lie" (with J.Season)	2021	—	Check Out the Event OST
"Lady Monster"	2021	—	Idol Recipe OST
"—" denotes releases that did not chart or were not released in that region.

== Filmography ==
=== Film ===
Year	Title		Role	Notes	Ref.
Year	English	Original	Role	Notes	Ref.
2022	Idol Recipe	아이돌 레시피	Jian	Main role	
2025	The Informant	정보원	Ju-hee		

=== Television series ===
Year	Title		Role	Notes	Ref.
Year	English	Original	Role	Notes	Ref.
2017	Part-time Idol	비정규직 아이돌	Herself	Cameo, Ep. 5	
2021	Dali & Cocky Prince	달리와 감자탕	Herself	Cameo, Ep.7	

=== Web series ===
Year	Title		Role	Notes	Ref.
Year	English	Original	Role	Notes	Ref.
2023	Duty After School	방과 후 전쟁활동	Lee Soon-yi	Supporting role	

=== Television shows ===
Year	Title		Role	Notes	Ref.
Year	English	Original	Role	Notes	Ref.
2016	K-pop Star 6: The Last Chance	K팝 스타 시즌6 더 라스트 찬스	Contestant		
2017	Night of Real Entertainment	본격연예 한밤		Ep. 21, 22, 42, 44-50	
2018	Video Star: Season 2	비디오스타2	Special MC	Ep. 127	
