= Khusugtun =

Mongolian musical ensemble

- Origin: Mongolia
- Genres: Mongolian folk music
- Years active: 2013–present
- Members: Batzorig Vaanchig; Ariunbold Dashdorj; Amarbayasgalan Chovjoo; Chuluunbaatar Oyungerel; Ulambayar Khurelbaatar; Adiyadorj Gombusuren

Khusugtun is a musical ensemble from Mongolia that plays music inspired by traditional Mongolian music. The group has released 2 albums and notably performed at the 2011 BBC Proms. In 2015, the group came in second place in the first season of Asia's Got Talent. The band is named after a type of cart, named a "khusug," that nomadic Mongolians would use to transport their yurts and other belongings.

== Members ==
- Batzorig Vaanchig - morin khuur, throat singing
- Ariunbold Dashdorj - morin khuur, guitar, throat singing
- Amarbayasgalan Chovjoo - yatga, vocals
- Chuluunbaatar Oyungerel - morin khuur, throat singing
- Ulambayar Khurelbaatar - cello, tovshuur, throat singing
- Adiyadorj Gombusuren - tsuur, percussion, throat singing

== Discography ==
- Khusugtun Ethnic-Ballad Group (2013)
- Jangar (2020)
