= ALF (character) =

Protagonist and titular character of American television series ALF

Gordon Shumway; "ALF"
- ALF character
- Gordon "ALF" Shumway in ALF
- First appearance: "A.L.F."
- Created by: Paul Fusco
- Performed by: Paul Fusco
- Portrayed by: Michu Meszaros (In-suit performer, ALF season 1)

In-universe information
- Full name: Gordon Shumway
- Nicknames: ALF; Gordo
- Species: Melmacian
- Gender: Male
- Family: Bob Shumway (father); Flo Shumway (mother); Curtis Shumway (brother); Augie Shumway (sister); Sherman Shumway (great great grandfather)
- Significant other: Rhonda (girlfriend)
- Origin: Melmac

Gordon Shumway, also known as ALF (acronym for "Alien Life Form"), is the protagonist and title character of the American television series ALF and its animated spin-offs, ALF: The Animated Series, and ALF Tales. ALF also starred in the poorly received television film Project ALF, and hosted the short lived talk show ALF's Hit Talk Show. Paul Fusco created and plays ALF, and he also provides the voice for the character. On ALF, Lisa Buckley and Bob Fappiano assisted Fusco with performing the furry brown alien. During the first season of ALF, Michu Meszaros occasionally wore a full costume when full body shots were needed of the character.

Since ALF, the character has appeared in various other media, including television series, comic books, and video games.

== Concept and creation ==
Paul Fusco created the character in 1984 using an alien-looking puppet, that he used to annoy his family and friends. Bernie Brillstein was approached to see Fusco's audition with a puppet character but was initially uninterested, having managed Jim Henson for years by that point, and regarding Henson as the best puppeteer in the business. However, Fusco's brief performance as ALF won over Brillstein, who thought the character was hilarious and strong enough to be the focus of a series.

Fusco was notoriously secretive about his character up until the series' premiere. During the show's production, Fusco refused to acknowledge that the puppet ALF was anything other than an alien. All involved with the production were cautioned not to reveal any of ALF's production secrets.

To avoid wear and tear on the principal ALF puppet, the performers rehearsed with a crude early version of ALF, nicknamed "RALF" for (Rehearsal Alien Life Form or Repulsive Alien Life Form). Fusco did not like to rehearse and would often substitute his hand or RALF for the real ALF puppet during rehearsals.

== Performance ==
To perform the titular alien on the ALF sitcom, Paul Fusco inserted his left hand into the head of the ALF puppet to perform the character's mouth, leaving his right hand to serve as ALF's right arm. Underneath trapdoors and holes on the set floor, Fusco would be assisted by a second puppeteer, Lisa Buckley, who was responsible for controlling the character's left hand. From off-screen, a third puppeteer, Bob Fappiano, would operate the character's eyes and other facial features via remote control. In recent years, Paul Fusco's wife, Linda Fusco, has regularly operated ALF's left hand.

When creating ALF's voice, Fusco initially took inspiration from that of Rowlf the Dog, a Muppet character performed by Jim Henson. Rowlf's gruff voice ended up straining Fusco's vocal cords, which led him to invent a new voice that was much lighter, evolving into ALF's voice as it is known today. In early episodes of the series, ALF speaks with a voice reminiscent of the earlier, Rowlf-esque voice.

During the first season of ALF, whenever the character had to be seen in full-body shots, Hungarian actor Michu Meszaros would don a life-sized ALF costume. However, Meszaros's services became too costly, and the regular ALF puppet would be used for all of his scenes on the show.

== Physiology and abilities ==
Alf was largely depicted as living a forced sedentary lifestyle in the series due to being required to remain in the Tanner home and backyard in order to avoid detection and capture by the Alien Task Force. However, the character indicated he had been involved in some version of Melmac's military, as he references an organization known as the Orbit Guard, and claims he had been given orders to mobilize not long before the destruction of the planet.

Despite his size, he was indicated in the pilot to be surprisingly heavy, and his heart was inferred to be located in the upper right side of his head. In the season two episode Something's Wrong With Me, he claimed to have eight stomachs, which he stated to be roughly 80% of a Melmacian's primary organs. Throughout the series, Alf's body was depicted to be considerably denser and hardier than that of humans, as he survived several close range explosions with little physiological damage, though he did contract amnesia during season one in the two-part episode Try to Remember as the result of electric shock (later broadcasts of the episode would edit this to being a head injury of unknown cause).

In the season one episode Wild Thing, Alf warned the Tanners of (and later underwent) what he called a "complex physiological and psychological transformation", which he stated all Melmacians go through every 75 years. This caused the individual to compulsively seek out cats, and required them to be locked away for a roughly twelve hour period from sunset to sunrise. The change also gave Alf previously unknown abilities, such as the capacity for seemingly flawless imitation, as he would duplicate the voices of Lynn, Brian, and Willie Tanner in rapid succession. The character saw an increase in speed, stealth, and strength during the episode. Evading the Tanners when he escaped confinement and stealing the Ochmonech's riding lawn mower, he travelled to a zoo, where he kidnapped a tiger off-screen, hinting at the enhancement to his physical strength during his transformation. Alf eventually returned to the Tanner home, seemingly drawn there by Brian Tanner's attempts to lure him back to the house via Alf's claimed capacity for telepathy with thoughts of a fork, concluding a running joke begun earlier in the episode.

In the comics produced by Marvel, Alf displayed the ability to turn invisible for limited periods of time by eating sponges. He also displayed the ability to attain superhuman strength due to the Melmacian body being able to develop musculature rapidly. In the issue, Alf claimed to have strength approaching that of the Grey Hulk, and was shown lifting the Tanner home completely off its foundations.

== Appearances ==
=== ALF ===
In ALF, ALF is an alien from the planet Melmac who has arrived on planet Earth, and lands in the Tanner family's garage. On Melmac, ALF was a member of the planet's Orbit Guard. He was given the nickname "ALF", by Willie Tanner in the pilot episode. ALF was born on October 28, 1756. He is troublesome, sarcastic, and cynical. ALF is generally regarded as one of the only Melmacians to survive his home planet's cataclysm. ALF stayed at the Tanner's house, in order to stay hidden from the government, and very rarely interacted with anyone outside of the family. In an episode from the first season, "Help Me, Rhonda", Willie is able to contact ALF's friend from Melmac, Skip, and Skip offers to fly by Earth to pick up ALF. ALF initially decides to go with Skip, but later changes his mind and decides he would rather stay with the Tanners instead.

Due to the series becoming popular with children, ALF didn't drink any alcohol after the first season, because NBC thought it made him a bad role model for children. ALF is also known to try to eat cats, including the Tanner family cat, Lucky; this later stopped after an episode in which ALF tried to microwave Lucky caused a child to try and microwave their own cat. Also, the episode "Try to Remember" depicted ALF using an electric mixer in a bathtub and getting amnesia, which caused a child to attempt this and nearly electrocute himself. The episode was then edited for all future airings, with ALF slipping in the shower instead, causing the amnesia. The episode also began with a PSA featuring ALF explaining the dangers of such actions.

=== ALF: The Animated Series ===
Gordon in ALF: The Animated Series

ALF: The Animated Series, a spin-off of ALF, depicts ALF's life on Melmac before it exploded. As the animated series takes place before ALF's life on Earth, he goes by his real name of "Gordon". Each episode depicts ALF and his family in some kind of wacky situation. His family members are his father Bob, his mother Flo, his younger brother Curtis, his little sister Augie, his dog Neep, and his bird Harry. Gordon has two friends named Skip, another named Rick Fusterman, and a girl he adores named Rhonda.

=== ALF Tales ===
In ALF Tales, a spin-off of ALF: The Animated Series, ALF and the other characters from ALF: The Animated Series portray various characters from fairy tales, in a more comedic manner than the original fairy tales. Occasionally in the series, ALF broke the fourth wall, and was seen preparing for the episode.

=== Project ALF ===
Project ALF was a 1996 television movie that was intended to wrap up the cliffhanger from the series finale of ALF. In the movie, ALF was on a military base after being captured by the Alien Task Force. The film was intended to also be a backdoor pilot for a new series, but was poorly received by the audience, partly due to the absence of the Tanners.

=== ALF's Hit Talk Show ===
In 2004, ALF hosted the short lived talk show ALF's Hit Talk Show. It was originally intended to be a one time special, but gained enough viewers for more episodes. The series is considered to be a flop and has been considered one of the worst talk shows in history.

=== Future appearances ===
==== Film ====
In 2012, it was announced that Fusco was pitching an ALF film. The film later reported to be a CGI-Live action hybrid film, to be developed by Sony Pictures Animation, with Jordan Kerner set to produce the film with Fusco and ALF co-creator, Tom Patchett. As of October 2022, no more information has been given about the film, including whether or not it is still in development.

==== ALF reboot ====
In 2018, it was reported that Warner Bros. was working on an ALF reboot, likely about ALF returning to earth and living with a new family. Later that year the reboot was reported as canceled. However, an article about the Head of the Class reboot in development at HBO Max, published by Deadline in May 2020, stated that the reboot is on the HBO Max development slate.

=== Other media ===
==== Marvel comics ====
An ALF comic book was published by Marvel Comics, under the banner of Star Comics. The ALF comic began in 1988 and ran for almost four years, totaling 50 issues and 3 annuals. For virtually the entire series' run, the creative team was: Michael Gallagher (script) and Dave Manak and Marie Severin (art). The comic loosely followed the continuity of the television show, and had a three stories per issue: two in the TV series universe and another inspired in the Cartoon with stories about Melmac.

==== Guest appearances ====
Due to the character's popularity, ALF has made many guest appearances:

- ALF starred in the 1987 television special ALF Loves a Mystery, in which ALF revealed NBC's Saturday morning lineup to the viewers.
- ALF was a semi-regular on the 1980s version of Hollywood Squares, where he also hosted part of one episode in March 1987. Later, in February 2003, ALF appeared as a celebrity guest on the Tom Bergeron version of the series, during their annual College Tournament.
- ALF appeared in a Season 2 episode of NBC's Matlock in 1987. He appeared on "Hollywood Today" where he talked about the late Greg Titleman.
- ALF hosted the 1989 Macy's Thanksgiving Day Parade.
- In 1989, ALF gave a Public service announcement for the United States Department of the Interior.
- The animated version of ALF also made an appearance in the "all-star" animated drug-prevention television special Cartoon All-Stars to the Rescue in 1990.
- ALF appeared in the Blossom episode "The Geek". He appears as the guardian to the Gates of Heaven in Blossom Russo's dream in which she has died upon donating her kidneys to the Pope. When Blossom notices the Stairs to Heaven, ALF stated that the Stairs of Heaven were installed for John Bonham and even states that everyone on Melmac has three kidneys...for lunch" (which ALF was kidding about). ALF denies Blossom entrance into Heaven upon her breaking the 11th Commandment that states "Thou Shall Not Geek" by dating Pinhead Fred and schedules her to be taken to Hell. On a related note, Blossom is shown to have a plush toy of ALF.
- ALF appeared in the German version of the dark ride Warner Bros. Classics & Great Gremlins Adventure at Warner Bros. Movie World Germany. For this ride, ALF was voiced by Tommi Piper.
- ALF appeared in the Love Boat: The Next Wave episode "Trances of a Lifetime".
- In the late 1990s, ALF hosted an episode of Talk Soup.
- In 2000, ALF appeared on The Cindy Margolis Show.
- In 2002, ALF appeared in a series of commercials for the 10-10-220 telephone service with Terry Bradshaw, Hulk Hogan, Mike Piazza, Emmitt Smith, and Toby Keith.
- In 2002, ALF appeared in NBC's 75th Anniversary Special.
- In 2003, ALF appeared on Jimmy Kimmel Live!
- In November 2007, ALF appeared as "TV Icon of the Week" on The O'Reilly Factor.
- In October 2011, ALF appeared on Good Morning America during their Totally Awesome '80s Week.
- In September 2013, ALF made a cameo on Saturday Night Live as a guest to wedding of fictional character Stefon to Anderson Cooper.
- ALF has a cameo in the 2016 Funny or Die parody film Donald Trump's The Art of the Deal: The Movie as Donald Trump's best man.
- ALF made an appearance in the sixth episode of Mr. Robot's second season, "eps2.4 m4ster-s1ave.aes", once again voiced by Fusco, during the majority of a dream that parodies mid-1980s to early 1990s sitcoms.
- In January 2019, ALF appeared in the Young Sheldon episode "A Race of Superhumans and a Letter to Alf".
- ALF made an appearance in the sixth episode of Duncanville. He is shown to work in an 80's-themed bar where he is the drummer of its house band.
- In June 2020, ALF appeared during a Summer Game Fest livestream event as a "Tech Correspondent" where he claimed to have created Vocaloid character Hatsune Miku.

== Influence on popular culture ==
=== References in other media ===
ALF has also often been referred to in various other media:

- ALF appeared in The Simpsons. In "Homer's Barbershop Quartet", ALF appeared in the cover Us magazine in a flashback to the 1980s. In "Bart Sells His Soul", Milhouse sells Bart's soul for ALF Pogs. In "The Springfield Files", ALF (voiced by Dan Castellaneta) appeared in a police line-up along with several other aliens (some of them being Gort, Chewbacca and Marvin the Martian). In "Mayored to the Mob", ALF appears at the Bi-Mon-Sci-Fi-Con. In "Mobile Homer", ALF appears on a TV Guide Magazine cover where Homer uses trying to hit a spider. In "The Many Saints of Springfield", ALF (reprised by Paul Fusco) appears on a magazine cover during the episode's couch gag. When Homer states that ALF was cancelled too soon, the magazine cover comes to life, and ALF states that he was pleased with his show's cancellation.
- ALF has appeared on Family Guy. In "I Never Met the Dead Man", ALF was seen in Peter Griffin's dream sequence. In "To Love and Die in Dixie", ALF appeared on an episode of E! True Hollywood Story. In "Brian Goes Back to College", Peter sees Brian at the convention wearing a bow tie and asks if he is ALF. In "Wild Wild West", Peter tries to nominate ALF for Mayor.
- In the 2002 film Jonah: A VeggieTales Movie, Larry says that "ALF is on in a half an hour".
- ALF appeared on Eminem's T-shirt in the 2009 music video "We Made You".
- In the 2010 film Hot Tub Time Machine an episode of ALF was seen on a TV screen in the ski lodge.
- ALF has appeared multiple times in Robot Chicken. The episode "But Not In That Way" sees him voiced by Seth Green. When Willie Tanner (also voiced by Green) states that Lucky (depicted here as a female cat) has given birth to a litter of kittens, ALF congratulates the Tanners as he asks if anyone is going to freak if he "eats the afterbirth". He appears in "Secret of the Booze" in a spoof of the Alien film franchise titled "Alien Life Form" as well as two short continuations titled "Alien Life Form 3" and "Alien Life Form: Resurrection". Here, he is voiced by Mikey Day. He reappears in a sketch in the episode "Your Mouth is Hanging Off Your Face" (again voiced by Day) where he shows Brian (voiced by Green) a rap video he filmed on Melmac, where he raps about his love for eating cats, more specifically, exotic and rare breeds, in contrast to most Melmacians. After watching the music video, Brian exclaims he wants to be just like ALF, not by rapping, but by attempting to eat the family cat Lucky. ALF chortles and asks Brian to save him some of the anus which he claims is "the best part".
- An ALF doll appeared in The Big Bang Theory episode "The Precious Fragmentation". Howard Wolowitz finds an ALF doll in the stuff that he, Sheldon, Leonard, and Raj find at the garage sale after they followed some guy that they thought was Adam West. Howard mentioned that his mother got him an ALF doll sometime after his father left and that he had often imagined that his father was on Melmac.
- ALF made a cameo appearance in an '80s-themed in-flight safety video for Delta Air Lines.
- ALF appeared in a Super Bowl XLV commercial in 2011, along with a host of other classic TV show characters.
- ALF was referred to in the 2012 video game XCOM: Enemy Unknown.
- ALF appeared in a new series of commercials for US electronics store Radio Shack in 2014. The commercials premiered during the 2014 Super Bowl XLVIII. ALF appeared in one commercial with a selection of other celebrities and characters made famous during the 1980s, and a second commercial on his own in which a Radio Shack employee demonstrated a modern cellphone.
- Permanent Midnight, a film based on Jerry Stahl, tells the story of his writing career, including ALF. ALF is changed in the film to Mr. Chompers.
- In the 2014 movie Guardians of the Galaxy, ALF puffy stickers and trading cards can be seen affixed to Star-Lord's radio/tape deck.
- In 2014, ALF starred in a series of ads to promote the DirecTV service on Latin America. Under the hashtag #alfvuelve, the marketing campaign showed ALF enjoying DirecTV on his TV, in a cellphone and in a tablet.

In 2015, ALF appeared in Season Two of “Mr. Robot” as the driver of a car who runs over and kills a policeman and then drives off.

- In 2015, the Teen Titans Go! episode "Oil Drums", had leader Robin saying "Let's watch ALF again. I love ALF. Yes, eat that cat, ALF, eat him. He's hiding in the kitchen drawer, ALF. But be patient. Savor the hunt, you beast!"
- Professional Rugby union player Gareth Thomas is commonly known by the nickname "Alfie", due to his alleged resemblance to ALF.
- The Guardians of the Galaxy character Drax the Destroyer is shown to be a fan of ALF.
- ALF dolls have appeared on The Goldbergs.
- An issue of a Marvel ALF comic appears in the 2022 I Am Groot short "Magnum Opus".
- ALF appeared on Impractical Jokers, where he and the jokers punish fellow joker and ALF fan Q by making him guess the hidden ingredients that he's eating in each dish from ALF's fictional cookbook.
- In an episode of Archer the eponymous protagonist used 'Gordon Shumway' as a cover identity while going undercover at a wedding in Minnesota.
- In the 2023 movie Robot Dreams, ALF appears on a TV Shows Magazine cover.

=== Merchandise ===
Like many shows of its day, ALF was also the subject of a trading card series by Topps. Most featured stills from various episodes, but a few cards parodied baseball cards by depicting players of the Melmacian sport "Bouillabaisseball," complete with stats such as "Splats". The yellow-bordered first series was released in 1987, with a red-bordered second series released in 1988.

ALF-related merchandise was sold during the show's original run, including a 1987 22-inch plush doll produced by Coleco, and a 1988 calendar with Melmac's planetary holidays, such as "Shout at a Shrub Day", prominently marked. In 1987, over $250 million in ALF merchandise were sold, including $85 million worth of Coleco's dolls.

=== Music ===
In 1987, Dutch remixer and producer Ben Liebrand created a song called "Stuck on Earth" with samples from an episode of ALF. The single charted at No. 4 in the Netherlands, No. 24 on the Finland's sales-only chart, No. 14 in the Flanders region of Belgium, No. 28 in Germany, and No. 3 in New Zealand.

During 1988, Burger King ran a promotion called "The Many Faces of ALF," giving away themed ALF puppets and a cardboard record with each kids meal. These records featured original recordings sung by ALF – titled "Melmac Girls", "Cookin' with ALF", "Melmac Rock", and "Take Me, ALF, to the Ballgame".

Tommi Piper, the actor who dubbed ALF's voice for German audiences, spent twelve weeks in the German pop charts in 1989. The single featured Amélie Sandmann (as the voice of Rhonda) and was called "Hallo ALF Hier Ist Rhonda" (translated "Hello ALF, This Is Rhonda"). He also featured as ALF on various themed mix albums introducing songs by pop artists of the time and other original compositions.

=== Video games ===
There are six video games and one printing program based on ALF: 1987's ALF, also known as ALF: The First Adventure, for various computer systems, such as the Commodore 64, IBM, and Apple II, 1989's ALF for the Master System, four educational games for IBM and Apple II computers released in 1988 called ALF's U.S. Geography, ALF's Thinking Skills, ALF's World of Words, and Add & Subtract With ALF, and the printing program ALF's Party Kit.

=== Other ===
ALF was invited to the White House by First Lady Nancy Reagan to the 1987 White House Christmas Party, where President Ronald Reagan told Fusco that ALF was his favorite show. In 2019, it was reported that a New Haven, Connecticut resident was working to get a statue of ALF placed in the city. Fusco is a New Haven native.

An ALF podcast "ALFsplaining" was launched in 2024 with contributions from writers Al Jean and Mike Reiss.

== Reception ==
TV Guide ranked ALF #8 on its "25 Greatest Sci-Fi Legends" list. MeTV ranked ALF #2 on its list of top TV aliens, behind only Star Trek's Mr. Spock. On its list of "10 Most Loveable Aliens In Sci-Fi TV History", Screen Rant ranked ALF at #5. ALF also won the award for Favorite TV Actor at the 1989 Kids' Choice Awards.
