= Brillstein Entertainment Partners =

American television production company

- Formerly: Brillstein/Grey Entertainment (1986–1994); Brillstein/Grey Communications (1994–2007)
- Industry: Talent and literary agencies
- Predecessor: The Brillstein Company (1969–1992)
- Founded: 1986; 40 years ago
- Founders: Bernie Brillstein; Brad Grey
- Headquarters: Beverly Hills, California, U.S.
- Key people: Jon Liebman; Marc Gurvitz; Cynthia Pett
- Members: 200 clients
- Parent: Wasserman (2023–present)
- Website: www.teamwass.com/entertainment/

Brillstein Entertainment Partners (formerly known as Brillstein/Grey Entertainment and Brillstein/Grey Communications) is a talent management firm and television production company formed by the 1986 addition of Brad Grey to The Brillstein Company, founded by Bernie Brillstein in 1969. On September 18, 2023, it was announced that Casey Wasserman's eponymous company had acquired BEP.

== The Brillstein Company ==
Bernie Brillstein formed The Brillstein Company in 1969, where he continued to manage stars and develop television programming, a career he began in the fabled mailroom of the William Morris Agency. He produced such popular television hits as Hee Haw, The Muppet Show, and Saturday Night Live.

Brillstein managed Saturday Night Live cast members Gilda Radner, John Belushi, and Lorne Michaels, as well as Jim Henson (of The Muppets fame) and Paul Fusco (voice and operator of ALF). Productions for television included ALF: The Animated Series and Normal Life.

In 1981, the company produced its first ever television series, Open All Night, under Freeway Productions.

In 1986, Lorimar-Telepictures bought out The Brillstein Company, whereas they would have to transform it into an independently operated and management unit of the studio.

The company became Brillstein Entertainment Partners after Brad Grey left the company to become the head of Paramount Pictures. It is now headed by Jonathan Liebman, Marc Gurvitz, and Cynthia Pett.

=== Film productions ===
- The Blues Brothers
- Continental Divide
- Doctor Detroit
- Dragnet
- Ghostbusters
- Ghostbusters II
- Neighbors
- Spies Like Us
- Summer Rental
- Up the Academy

=== Television productions ===
- For American Broadcasting Company (ABC):
  - Open All Night (as Freeway Productions)
  - The Real Ghostbusters
  - The Slap Maxwell Story (as Slap Happy Productions)
- For National Broadcasting Company (NBC):
  - ALF (as Alien Productions)
  - Buffalo Bill (as Stampede Productions)
  - The Days and Nights of Molly Dodd (as You and Me, Kid Productions)
- For Showtime
  - It's Garry Shandling Show (as Our Production Company)
  - The Boys (Norm Crosby)

== Brillstein-Grey Entertainment ==
In 1984, Brillstein met Brad Grey at a television convention in San Francisco. In 1986, the two formed a production company, Brillstein-Grey Entertainment, which packaged programming and managed talent. In 1991, the company signed a production and distribution deal with Sony Pictures Entertainment to produce and distribute films and programs produced by the company. In 1994, Brillstein-Grey had reached a deal with Capital Cities/ABC to start Brillstein-Grey Communications.

=== Film productions ===
- Bulletproof
- The Cable Guy
- City by the Sea
- Dirty Work
- Dysfunktional Family
- Happy Gilmore (Adam Sandler)
- Hexed
- Jiminy Glick in Lalawood
- Jingle Jangle: A Christmas Journey
- Mean Machine
- My Baby's Daddy
- Opportunity Knocks
- The Replacement Killers
- Run Ronnie Run!
- Scary Movie
- Scary Movie 2
- Scary Movie 3
- Scary Movie 4
- Scary Movie V
- Screwed
- The Six Wives of Henry Lefay
- The Specials
- View from the Top
- The Wedding Singer
- What Planet Are You From?

=== Television productions ===
- For American Broadcasting Company (ABC)
  - According to Jim
  - Politically Incorrect with Bill Maher
  - The Dana Carvey Show
  - C-16: FBI
- For Home Box Office (HBO)
  - The Larry Sanders Show (Garry Shandling, Rip Torn, Jeffrey Tambor)
  - The Sopranos (James Gandolfini, Edie Falco, Lorraine Bracco)
  - Mr. Show with Bob and David
  - Def Comedy Jam (1991-1997)
- For NBC and ABC
  - The Naked Truth
  - The Jeff Foxworthy Show (Jeff Foxworthy)
- For National Broadcasting Company (NBC)
  - NewsRadio (Phil Hartman, Jon Lovitz)
  - Just Shoot Me! (David Spade)
  - Sammy
  - The Awesome Show (Chris Hardwick)
  - Black Tie Affair
  - Space Cats
- For Fox Broadcasting Company (FOX)
  - Charlie Hoover (Tim Matheson)
  - Pasadena
- For First-run syndication
  - The Dennis Miller Show
- For The WB Television Network (The WB)
  - The Steve Harvey Show (Steve Harvey)
  - Alright Already
- For CBS Broadcasting (CBS)
  - Good Sports (Ryan O'Neal, Farrah Fawcett)
  - Normal Life
  - The Dave Thomas Comedy Show (as REM Productions)
  - My Big Fat Greek Life
- For Comedy Central
  - Primetime Glick

== Miscellaneous ==
The new management company Eric Murphy joins in HBO's Entourage is based on Brillstein Entertainment, as well as the character Murray Berenson based on the company's founder Bernie Brillstein.

Brillstein sold his shares in the company to Universal Pictures in 1996, giving Grey, his one time protégé, full rein over operations. In 1998, the Brillstein-Grey Communications division was renamed to Brillstein-Grey Television after ABC took back its shares in the company. Before that, Buena Vista Television picked up syndication rights to C-16: FBI, before the series was cancelled.

In 1999, Universal sold Brillstein's shares to Grey, and the company's television unit was subsequently rechristened Brad Grey Television as a result. Also, Brad Grey Television struck a deal with Columbia TriStar Television to produce and distribute television shows. Briefly, in 1999, it became Basic Entertainment, before reverting to its original name in 2000.

In 2002, Brad Grey Pictures was shut down, and it was replaced by Plan B Entertainment. Also that year, the company's television unit secured a distribution deal with 20th Century Fox Television. Grey sold his interest in the company in 2005 due to his succeeding Sherry Lansing as Chief executive officer of Paramount Pictures, which created a conflict of interest, and also that year, secured a deal with Touchstone Television. In 2007, the company became the current Brillstein Entertainment Partners.

Several shows by the company now have ancillary rights owned by NBCUniversal Television and Streaming. Some of these shows are distributed by Sony Pictures Television in North America.
