= Melmac =

Melmac is:

- A brand name of dinnerware molded from Melamine resin, made by American Cyanamid, most popular in the 1940s through the 1960s.
- The fictional planet and homeworld to the alien life form in the eponymously titled sitcom ALF (TV series) (see also New Melmac)
- A Staten Island, NY based ska band from the late 1990s.
- SKV Melmac, a university korfball club from Tilburg, Netherlands, re-established in 2005
- An acronym for the Maine Educational Loan Marketing Corporation
- A variety of Psilocybe cubensis mushrooms.
- Gunther Melmac, a character from Pixar's Elio.
