= Paul Fusco =

American puppeteer and actor

- Born: January 29, 1953 (age 73); New Haven, Connecticut, U.S.
- Occupations: Puppeteer; actor; television producer; writer; director
- Years active: 1972-present
- Employer(s): Alien Productions; HBO
- Spouse: Linda Fusco (m. 1978)
- Children: 1

Paul Fusco (born January 29, 1953) is an American puppeteer, actor, television producer, writer and director. He is known as the puppeteer and voice of the title character on the sitcom ALF, for which he also served as creator, writer, producer, and director. He formed the production company Alien Productions with Tom Patchett and Bernie Brillstein.

== Early life ==
Fusco was born on January 29, 1953 in New Haven, Connecticut.

== Career ==
Fusco had been producing a series of puppet-centered television specials that aired on Showtime Network, many centered around the holidays, beginning in the early 1980s.

=== ALF ===
Through Bernie Brillstein Fusco met Tom Patchett, and together they came up with the concept behind the ALF sitcom. They pitched the idea to NBC's Brandon Tartikoff, who commissioned the show. ALF began in 1986 and lasted four seasons, during which 99 episodes were produced.

Fusco also created and produced two animated series for NBC: ALF: The Animated Series and ALF Tales. A co-production of DIC, Alien Productions, Lorimar-Telepictures, and Saban Entertainment, the cartoons portrayed Gordon Shumway (ALF) and his family in their days on Melmac prior to the planet explosion. Animated segments were hosted by the live-action ALF, who read letters from viewers and told stories about life back home. Space Cats, a Paul Fusco-produced show in association with Marvel Productions, also ran on NBC in the early 1990s, which was another mix of live action puppetry and animation. The episodes would begin with the live action puppetry where Captain Catgut (voiced by Fusco), the leader of the Spacecats, would receive a mission briefing about the trouble at hand. Space Cats lasted one season and produced 13 episodes, being cancelled after NBC withdrew its commitment to Saturday morning cartoons.

NBC cancelled ALF in 1990 after production wrapped for Season Four, leaving the final episode ("Consider Me Gone") as an unresolved cliffhanger. ABC offered Fusco closure to the story arc and produced a television movie in 1996 called Project ALF co-starring Martin Sheen. The movie (produced by Paul Fusco Productions) saw ALF escaping from the military base where he had been held for testing, but the scientist who he thinks will help him is really plotting to expose his existence to the world on a television talk show.

Between 1996 and 2001, ALF made television guest appearances including The Cindy Margolis Show, Talk Soup, and Love Boat: The Next Wave. Fusco continued the trend by featuring ALF on NBC's 75th Anniversary Show and the 2003 TV Land Awards. During 2003–04, he revived his guest spot on Hollywood Squares, and also became the "spokesalien" for phone company 10-10-220. ALF merchandise also returned with posters, figures and T-shirts. The American-Canadian DVD release of the original sitcom was the recipient of much critical and fan backlash due to distributor Lionsgate Home Entertainment's insistence on utilizing syndicated/edited versions instead of remastering the original uncut NBC-TV broadcast versions, resulting in poor sales.

The ALF renaissance led to ALF's Hit Talk Show in 2004, created and produced by Fusco for TV Land. The show was a mix of celebrity chat and skits filmed in front of a live audience from Hollywood's Sunset Boulevard and lasted eight episodes. In November 2007, ALF appeared as "TV Icon of the Week" on The O'Reilly Factor. In 2016, ALF made appearances on two different television series, Mr. Robot and Young Sheldon, one episode of each.

In August 2012, Fusco confirmed that Sony Pictures Animation had acquired the rights to ALF and would develop the property into a CGI-live action hybrid feature. The Smurfs producer Jordan Kerner would also produce the film, along with Tom Patchett and Fusco.

== Filmography ==
Year	Film	Role	Notes
1972	Mr. Goober	Unknown role	
1981	The Crown of Bogg	Prince Milo/Vandred	Television film
1982	The Valentine's Day that Almost Wasn't	Bugsy Slime, Sam Cupid	
1983	Santa's Magic Toy Bag	Santa	Television film
1983	A Thanksgiving Tale	Tom Turkey	
1984	The Moonstone Gem	Unknown role	Television film
1985	Dumbo's Circus	Master puppeteer	Episode: "Uncle Lattimer Says "Merci""
1985	Kidstime with T.X. Critter	T.X. Critter	
1986–1990	ALF	ALF, Wayne Schlegel, Crime Stoppers Host, Rick Fusterman	Main role; Also co-creator
1987	ALF: The Animated Series	ALF (voice)	Main role; Also co-creator
1987	Matlock	ALF	Episode: "The Network"
1988	ALF Tales	ALF (voice)	Main role; Also co-creator
1989	The Wickedest Witch	Ersatz	Television film (also producer)
1990	Cartoon All-Stars to the Rescue	ALF (voice)	Television special
1990	A Very Retail Christmas	Puppet performer	
1991	Blossom	ALF	Episode: "The Geek"
1991	Space Cats	Captain Catgut (voice and puppeteer)	Main role; Also creator
1996	Project ALF	ALF	Television film
1999	Love Boat: The Next Wave	ALF	Episode: "Trances of a Lifetime"
2000	The Cindy Margolis Show	ALF	Episode: "Out of This World"
2002	NBC 75th Anniversary Special	ALF	1 episode
2003	TV Land Awards: A Celebration of Classic TV	ALF	1 episode
2004	Hollywood Squares	ALF	1 episode
2004	ALF's Hit Talk Show	ALF	Main role
2007	The O'Reilly Factor	ALF	1 episode
2011	Good Morning America	ALF	1 episode
2012	The Hub's ALF Week	ALF	
2016	Donald Trump's The Art of the Deal: The Movie	ALF	Television film
2016	Mr. Robot	ALF	Episode: "eps2.4_m4ster-s1ave.aes"
2019	Young Sheldon	ALF	Episode: "A Race of Superhumans and a Letter to ALF"
2020	Duncanville	ALF (voice)	Episode: "Sister, Wife"
2023	The Simpsons	ALF (voice)	Episode: "The Many Saints of Springfield"
2024	Impractical Jokers	ALF	Episode: "ALF"
