= Bernie Brillstein =

American producer and talent agent (1931–2008)

- Born: Bernard Jules Brillstein; April 26, 1931; New York City, U.S.
- Died: August 7, 2008 (aged 77); Los Angeles, California, U.S.
- Resting place: Hillside Memorial Park Cemetery
- Education: New York University
- Spouses: Laura Smith (m. 1967) Deborah Ellen Koskoff (m. 1975) Carrie Winston (m. 1998)

Bernard Jules Brillstein (April 26, 1931 – August 7, 2008) was an American film and television producer, executive producer, and talent agent.

He began his career in the 1950s at the William Morris Agency before founding his own company in 1969 and later joining forces with Brad Grey to helm Brillstein-Grey Entertainment (now Brillstein Entertainment Partners), one of the most important and influential Hollywood talent management and production companies. He is remembered for producing successful TV programs like Hee Haw, The Muppet Show, and The Sopranos, and hit films including The Blues Brothers, Ghostbusters and Happy Gilmore.

== Early life ==
Bernie Brillstein was born to a Jewish family in Manhattan, to Moe Brillstein and Matilda "Tillie" Brillstein (née Perlman), who all shared the Manhattan home of his uncle, the vaudeville and radio performer Jack Pearl. Brillstein's father, a milliner, was the guiding force behind the building of the Millinery Center Synagogue, a synagogue located in the Garment District in Manhattan.

== Career ==
Brillstein earned his way into show business in the mailroom at the William Morris Agency (WMA) in New York. He worked his way up to talent agent and by the 1960s, he was a manager-producer of television programming for the company. Still associated with WMA, he joined Management III in 1964 to continue talent management. In the 1960s, he also co-founded the vocal group The Doodletown Pipers.

=== The Brillstein Company ===
By now living in Los Angeles, Brillstein formed The Brillstein Company in 1969. There, he continued to manage stars and develop television programming. He produced such popular television hits as Hee Haw, The Muppet Show and Saturday Night Live.

Brillstein later became manager of SNL alumni Dan Aykroyd, Gilda Radner, John Belushi, Martin Short, and executive producer Lorne Michaels, as well as Jim Henson (of Muppets fame) and Paul Fusco (voice and operator of ALF). He produced such other television shows as ALF: The Animated Series, and Normal Life. He was also exclusive producer to the animation sequel The Real Ghostbusters (based on the hit movie).

=== Brillstein-Grey Entertainment ===
In the 1980s, he met Brad Grey at a television convention in San Francisco. In 1991, the two formed a production company, Brillstein-Grey Entertainment, which packages programming and manages talent. They were responsible for such shows as NewsRadio, The Steve Harvey Show, Just Shoot Me!, The Larry Sanders Show and The Sopranos. As executive producer, Brillstein was responsible for such successes as The Blues Brothers, Ghostbusters, Dragnet, Ghostbusters II, Happy Gilmore and The Cable Guy. Brillstein sold his shares in the company to Grey, his one time protégé, in 1996. Grey sold his interest in the company in 2005. He also represented Nick Swardson for six years prior to his death.

Brillstein's 1999 memoir, Where Did I Go Right?: You're No One in Hollywood Unless Someone Wants You Dead, was co-written with David Rensin. Two years later, he received the honor as recipient of a star on Hollywood Walk of Fame, on April 18, 2001. His second book The Little Stuff Matters Most, a humorous advice collection, was published in 2004.

== Personal life ==
In 1967, Brillstein married Laura Smith. In 1975, he married Deborah Ellen Koskoff. In 1998, Brillstein married Carrie Winston Brillstein, a marriage that lasted until his 2008 death.

Brillstein died of chronic obstructive pulmonary disease at a Los Angeles hospital on August 7, 2008, at the age of 77.

== Filmography ==
He was a producer in all films unless otherwise noted.

=== Film ===
Year	Film	Credit	Notes
1980	Up the Academy	Executive producer	
1980	The Blues Brothers	Executive producer	
1981	Continental Divide	Executive producer	
1981	Neighbors	Executive producer	
1983	Doctor Detroit	Executive producer	
1984	Ghostbusters	Executive producer	
1985	Summer Rental	Executive producer	
1985	Spies Like Us	Executive producer	
1987	Dragnet	Executive producer	
1989	Ghostbusters II	Executive producer	
1993	Hexed	Executive producer	
1996	Happy Gilmore	Executive producer	
1996	The Cable Guy	Executive producer	
1996	Bulletproof	Executive producer	
1998	The Replacement Killers		
2000	What Planet Are You From?	Executive producer	
2002	Run Ronnie Run!	Executive producer	
2004	Jiminy Glick in Lalawood		Final film as a producer

Thanks

Year	Film	Role
2008	A Federal Case	Acknowledgment

=== Television ===
Year	Title	Credit	Notes
1973	The Burns and Schreiber Comedy Hour	Executive producer	
1974	The Muppets Valentine Show	Executive producer	Television special
1981	Open All Night	Executive producer	
1982	The Valentine's Day That Almost Wasn't	Executive producer	Television special
1983	Sitcom	Executive producer	Television film
1983−1984	Buffalo Bill	Executive producer	
1985	Big Shots in America	Executive producer	Television short
1986	Comedy Factory	Executive producer	
1986−1990	ALF	Executive producer	
1986−1990	It's Garry Shandling's Show	Executive producer	
1987	CBS Summer Playhouse	Executive producer	
1987−1991	The Days and Nights of Molly Dodd	Executive producer	
1987−1989	ALF: The Animated Series	Executive producer	
1988	ALF Tales	Executive producer	
1988	The Boys	Executive producer	
1989	The Wickedest Witch	Executive producer	Television film
1990	Normal Life	Executive producer	
1990	Don't Try This at Home!	Executive producer	Television film
1990	A Very Retail Christmas	Executive producer	Television short
1991	Good Sports	Executive producer	
1991	Space Cats	Executive producer	
1992	The Please Watch the Jon Lovitz Special	Executive producer	Television special
1995−1999	NewsRadio	Executive producer	
1995−1997	The Jeff Foxworthy Show	Executive producer	
1995−1997	Mr. Show with Bob and David	Executive producer	
1995−1997	The Naked Truth	Executive producer	
1996	For Hope	Executive producer	Television film
1996	Mr. Show with Bob and David: Fantastic Newness	Executive producer	Television short
1996−2002	The Steve Harvey Show	Executive producer	
1996−2002	Politically Incorrect	Executive producer	
1997−2003	Just Shoot Me!	Executive producer	
1998	Mr. Show and the Incredible, Fantastical News Report	Executive producer	Television short
1999−2000	The Martin Short Show	Executive producer	
2001−2003	Primetime Glick	Executive producer	
2001−2004	The Wayne Brady Show	Executive producer	
2002	Next!	Executive producer	
2003	The Lyon's Den	Executive producer	
2003−2004	Comedy Inc.	Executive producer	
2006	Heist	Executive producer	

Miscellaneous crew

Year	Title	Role
1986−91	The Real Ghostbusters	Executive consultant

As an actor

Year	Title	Role	Notes	Other notes
1984	The Ratings Game	Man in Le Boeuf	Television film	Uncredited
2004	The Sopranos	Himself		

Thanks

Year	Title	Role	Notes
1984	The Ratings Game	Special thanks	Television film
1986	The Garry Shandling Show: 25th Anniversary Special	Special thanks	Television special
2008	Saturday Night Live	Dedicatee	

== Publications ==
- Bernie Brillstein with David Rensin (1999). Where Did I Go Right?: You're No One in Hollywood Unless Someone Wants You Dead!. Little Brown Inc. ISBN 978-0-316-11885-9 (Chapter One online)
- The Little Stuff Matters Most (2004). Bernie Brillstein with David Rensin ISBN 1-59240-079-5
