= ALF (TV series) =

American television sitcom (1986–1990)

- Genre: Sitcom; Science fiction comedy
- Created by: Tom Patchett; Paul Fusco
- Starring: Max Wright; Anne Schedeen; Andrea Elson; Benji Gregory
- Theme music composer: Alf Clausen; Tom Kramer
- Composer: Alf Clausen
- Country of origin: United States
- Original language: English
- No. of seasons: 4
- No. of episodes: 97 (original run); 100 (syndication) (list of episodes)

Production
- Executive producers: David Salzman; Bernie Brillstein; Tom Patchett
- Producer: Paul Fusco
- Camera setup: Multi-camera
- Running time: 24 minutes
- Production company: Alien Productions

Original release
- Network: NBC
- Release: September 22, 1986 – March 24, 1990

ALF is an American television science fiction sitcom that aired on NBC from September 22, 1986, to March 24, 1990.

The titular character, ALF, an acronym for "Alien Life Form", but whose real name is Gordon Shumway, crash-lands in the garage of the suburban California middle-class Tanner family. The series stars Max Wright as father Willie Tanner, Anne Schedeen as mother Kate Tanner, and Andrea Elson and Benji Gregory as their children, Lynn and Brian Tanner. ALF was performed by puppeteer Paul Fusco, who co-created the show with Tom Patchett. However, in scenes where he appeared in full body, he was performed by Michu Meszaros, who was uncredited in the role.

Produced by Alien Productions, ALF ran for four seasons and 97 episodes, including three one-hour episodes ("Try to Remember", "ALF's Special Christmas", "Tonight, Tonight"). These episodes were divided into two parts for syndication, for a total of 100 episodes. The series ended with an unresolved cliffhanger with a 1996 television film. Project: ALF was released that year to serve as a series finale for the franchise. The series was videotaped at Century Studios, 8660 Hayden Place in Culver City California.

In August 2018, Warner Bros. Television announced the development of an ALF reboot, which was later canceled in November of that year. In February 2022, it was announced that Shout! Studios had acquired distribution rights to the ALF titles, and would "develop new ALF-related content," with the company Maximum Effort subsequently joining in July 2023 to develop new material as well.

== Plot ==
Gordon Shumway is an alien from the planet Melmac who follows an amateur radio signal to Earth and crash-lands into the garage of the Tanners, a suburban middle-class family who live in the San Fernando Valley area of California. The family consists of social worker Willie (Max Wright), his wife Kate (Anne Schedeen), their teenage daughter Lynn (Andrea Elson), younger son Brian (Benji Gregory), and pet cat Lucky, whom ALF wishes to consume.

Willie gives Gordon the nickname ALF ("Alien Life Form"), and, unsure what to do, the Tanners take ALF into their home to hide him from the Alien Task Force, a part of the U.S. military that specializes in aliens, and their nosy neighbors Trevor and Raquel Ochmonek (John LaMotta and Liz Sheridan), until he can repair his spacecraft. Though his culture shock, survivor's guilt, and loneliness often cause problems for the Tanners, as well as their fear of what could happen if others were to discover his existence, they grow to care for and love him as a part of the family.

Later it is revealed that ALF's home planet, Melmac, exploded due to nuclear war, leaving him and other survivors of his species without a home, and that he survived its destruction because he was away as part of the Melmac Orbit Guard. In the season one episode "Pennsylvania 6-5000", ALF tries to convince the President of the United States to stop the nuclear program, as he fears that Earth could suffer a similar fate to Melmac, though a misunderstanding causes the President and national security to call the FBI to arrest Willie.

Episodes dealt with ALF learning about Earth and making new friends both in and out of the Tanner family, including Willie's brother Neal (Jim J. Bullock); Kate's widowed mother Dorothy (Anne Meara), with whom ALF has a love-hate relationship; her boyfriend and later husband Whizzer (Paul Dooley); the Ochmoneks' nephew Jake (Josh Blake); the psychologist Larry (Bill Daily); and the blind woman Jody (Andrea Covell), who never learns of ALF's true nature, but does know through touch that he is short and hairy.

Changes occur in the Tanner household over the course of the series, including the birth of a new child, Eric, who was added to the series because Anne Schedeen was pregnant at the time; ALF moving from the laundry room to the attic, which he and Willie convert into an "apartment", and the death of Lucky in the season four episode "Live and Let Die", which ALF accepts despite having previously attempted to catch and eat him due to having come to love and respect him. When ALF adopts a new cat with the intention of eating it, he grows fond of it and allows the Tanners to adopt it. In the 1996 movie Project ALF, which follows ALF after his capture by the USAF, the Tanners do not appear due to moving to Iceland.

== Characters ==
=== Main ===
- Gordon "ALF" Shumway (performed by Paul Fusco; credited by Michu Meszaros as one of ALF's assistants in costume, Lisa Buckley and Bob Fappiano as assistant puppeteers) is an alien from the planet Melmac, where he was a member of its Orbit Guard, who arrives on Earth and lands in the Tanner family's garage. He is given the nickname "ALF" by Willie.
- Willie Tanner (portrayed by Max Wright) is the father of the Tanner family, who works as a social worker. Willie is a kind but often overwhelmed man who tries to maintain order in his home despite ALF's constant chaos. His relationship with ALF is a classic love-hate dynamic—while he clearly cares for ALF and helps him stay hidden from the government, he's also frequently exasperated by ALF's reckless behavior, destructive habits, and bad influence on the kids. Despite his frustration, ALF and Willie have a mutual impact on each other, and formed a relationship somewhat akin to a mix of siblings (though which is the elder sibling in the situation tended to depend on the episode) and surrogate father and son, with Willie playing the father role despite being much younger than Alf, who was stated to be over two hundred and twenty years old by the time of the series. ALF helps Willie break out of his rigid, overly cautious nature, encouraging him to embrace spontaneity and loosen up. In turn, Willie tries (and mostly fails) to teach ALF responsibility and restraint. In "Varsity Drag" (Season 2), we learn Willie is a graduate from Amherst College where he was a social science major "Don't Be Afraid of the Dark" (Season 3). He is also a keen amateur radio enthusiast, and the transmission of his shortwave radio signals causes ALF to follow them and crash into his house. In his pastime, Willie also collects scale model train sets.
- Kate Tanner (portrayed by Anne Schedeen) is the mother of the Tanner family. Unlike Willie, who tries to reason with ALF, Kate has little patience for his antics and often lays down the law when he gets out of control. Despite her exasperation, Kate deeply cares for her family and, over time, develops a grudging tolerance for ALF. While she's often the first to scold him, she also protects him when necessary. In addition to her mother, she has at least one sister. She majored in art history at Amherst College where she met her husband and occasionally works in real estate. In "Having My Baby", she gives birth to her son, Eric.
- Lynn Tanner (portrayed by Andrea Elson) is the oldest child of the Tanner family and attends South Bay High School. Lynn is generally kind-hearted and forms a close bond with ALF, often acting as his confidante and helping him stay out of trouble (or at least trying to). She starts off as a typical teenager but matures over the course of the show, eventually getting a job and going to California State University, Northridge.
- Brian Tanner (portrayed by Benji Gregory) is the middle child of the Tanner family. As a child, Brian is naturally more accepting of ALF than the adults in the household, and he quickly forms a strong bond with the alien. In many ways, Brian serves as ALF's sidekick, often being the only one who listens to ALF's crazy stories and ideas without immediate skepticism. He admires ALF's wild personality and sense of adventure, even if he doesn't always understand the consequences of ALF's schemes. Throughout the series, Brian often helps ALF in small but meaningful ways, whether it's covering for him when he gets into trouble or participating in his antics, usually with some hesitation. Unlike his older sister Lynn, who sometimes acts as ALF's voice of reason, Brian is more of an innocent bystander, caught up in the fun but not always fully grasping the chaos ALF causes. Also, he forms a friendship with Jake Ochmonek, who also knows about ALF's existence. The three were often seen together in the show's third season. Alf and Brian's close bond went both ways, as anytime Brian was distressed or in trouble, Alf would attempt to intercede on his behalf, though this usually caused more problems than it solved due to Alf's more brash personality and the constant culture clash between Earth and Melmac.
- Eric Tanner (portrayed by Charles Nickerson) is the younger son of the Tanner family. He first appeared at the end of "Having My Baby" (Season 3), when ALF and the Tanner family met him. As a baby, he doesn't play an active role in the story, but his arrival changes the family dynamic—especially with ALF. ALF takes a strong interest in Eric, often acting as an unusual babysitter and claiming to teach him “important” life lessons (which usually involve mischief). He even treats Eric like a fellow Melmacian, as if shaping him into a mini version of himself.
- Lucky is the Tanners' family cat, who ALF attempts to catch and eat. He dies in "Live and Let Die" (Season 4) and is succeeded by Lucky II.

=== Supporting ===
- Trevor Ochmonek (played by John LaMotta) is a neighbor of the Tanner family and Raquel's husband. In "The Boy Next Door" (Season 2), we learn that he holds a Master of Arts degree in art history, that he played football for seven years in high school and that he is a veteran of the Korean War, where he served as a pilot. In "Come Fly With Me" (Season 1), it is revealed that he is allergic to shellfish.
- Raquel Ochmonek (portrayed by Liz Sheridan) is a neighbor of the Tanner family and Trevor's wife. She is very nosy, often spying on her neighbors and spreading rumors. She was also a cheerleader in high school.
- Jake Ochmonek (portrayed by Josh Blake) is Trevor and Raquel's nephew, who was sent to live with them after his father was arrested. He befriends Brian and discovers the existence of ALF. He also flirts with Lynn, but she often rejects him. In season 3, he dates a girl named Laura, with assistance from ALF, but breaks up with her due to her weird laugh.
- Jody (portrayed by Andrea Covell) is a blind woman whom ALF befriends in "For Your Eyes Only" (Season 1).
- Larry Dykstra (portrayed by Bill Daily) is a psychologist who was called in to help resolve a conflict between Willie and ALF.
- Dorothy Halligan Deaver (portrayed by Anne Meara) is Kate's widowed mother, Willie's mother-in-law, and Lynn, Brian, and Eric's maternal grandmother. She marries Whizzer in Season 2. She and Alf have a mostly antagonistic relationship with one another, largely stemming from their introduction in the season one episode "Mother and Child Reunion". In that episode, Alf forced a confrontation between Dorothy and Kate, who had felt smothered by Dorothy over the years prior to Alf's arrival. Their relationship made her the closest thing to an "enemy" for Alf in the series, though the mutual enmity never went beyond insulting each other.
- Whizzer Deaver (portrayed by Paul Dooley) is Dorothy's second husband, Kate's stepfather, Willie's stepfather-in-law, and Lynn, Brian, and Eric's step-grandfather. He is also a jazz musician, and later meets ALF.
- Neal Tanner (portrayed by Jim J. Bullock) is Willie's younger brother and Brian, Lynn, and Eric's uncle. He briefly lived with the Tanner family after his wife Margaret left him before moving into his own apartment and getting a job as a handyman at the same apartment building. Neal learned of Alf's existence and befriended the alien, though he was often more confused by Alf's behavior than even Willie at times. Willie was also stated to have a brother named "Rodney" in the episode La Cucaracha, and it is unknown if this was a third Tanner sibling or if the character was renamed to Neal, as "Rodney" was never seen on screen, leaving the matter ambiguous.

== Episodes ==
Season	Episodes	Originally released		Rank	Rating
Season	Episodes	First released	Last released	Rank	Rating
1	25	September 22, 1986	May 11, 1987	#28	16.5 (Note: Tied with Hunter)
2	24	September 21, 1987	May 9, 1988	#10	18.8 (Note: Tied with The Wonder Years)
3	24	October 3, 1988	May 8, 1989	#13	17.7 (Note: Tied with Matlock)
4	24	September 18, 1989	March 24, 1990	#39	13.7 (Note: Tied with Family Matters and Jake and the Fatman)

== Production ==
Producer Bernie Brillstein was approached to see Fusco's audition with a puppet character but was initially uninterested, having managed Jim Henson for years and regarding Henson as the best puppeteer in showbiz. However, Fusco's brief performance as ALF won over Brillstein, who thought the character was hilarious and strong enough to be the focus of a series.

Fusco co-produced the series with Tom Patchett. Patchett also co-created, wrote, and directed the series. The series was first syndicated by Warner Bros. Television and Lorimar-Telepictures. The U.S. syndication rights were passed over to Debmar-Mercury when its parent company, Lionsgate, owned home video rights. Shout! Factory assumed distribution rights to the series in February 2022.

Due to the inherent nature of producing a show featuring hand-operated puppets (à la Jim Henson's The Muppet Show), ALF was technically difficult and extremely demanding on series creator Fusco as well as its four lead actors. All confirmed during a 2000 People magazine interview that there were constant high levels of tension on the set. Max Wright said that he despised supporting a technically demanding puppet that received most of the good lines of dialogue. He admitted to being "hugely eager to have ALF over with." Artie Lange, who later worked with Wright on The Norm Show, told of a time when Wright had become "crazed" and physically attacked ALF, causing producers to have to pull Wright off the puppet. Anne Schedeen said that on the last night of taping the final episode, "there was one take and Max walked off the set, went to his dressing room, got his bags, went to his car and disappeared... There were no goodbyes." Schedeen herself said "there was no joy on the set... it was a technical nightmare – extremely slow, hot and tedious... A 30-minute show took 20, 25 hours to shoot." While fond of her on-screen children, Schedeen said some adults had "difficult personalities. The whole thing was a big dysfunctional family." Schedeen added, "It's astonishing that ALF really was wonderful and that word never got out what a mess our set really was." Andrea Elson, who suffered from bulimia during the second season of shooting, said, "If ALF had gone one more year, everybody would have lost it." Wright later admitted that as the years passed he looked back at ALF with less animosity and conceded that "It doesn't matter what I felt or what the days were like, ALF brought people a lot of joy." In reference to the tension, Fusco commented in 2012, "It was just the nature of the beast. There was no way we could have made it go any further or any faster," he insisted. "I think it was frustrating that it would take so long, but people got paid for what they did. Despite what people thought, that there was a lot of tension on set, there really wasn't."

Fusco was notoriously secretive about his character up until the series' premiere. During the show's production, Fusco refused to acknowledge that the puppet ALF was anything other than an alien. All involved with the production were cautioned not to reveal any of ALF's production secrets.

The set was built on a platform raised four feet above the ground, with trap doors constructed at many points so ALF could appear almost anywhere; Fusco operated him from underneath, so the unoccupied holes throughout the floor were deep and treacherous. The trap doors had to be reset multiple times, sometimes during a single scene. Principal puppeteer Paul Fusco (who was mainly left-handed when puppeteering) control ALF's mouth with his left hand, while his right hand controlled ALF's right arm. Another puppeteer, Lisa Buckley, who later performed on Sesame Street, assisted Fusco beneath the stage, operating ALF's left arm. At times when ALF's full body was shown in the sitting position, Lisa controlled ALF's left hand by cable allowing slight finger movements. A third puppeteer, Bob Fappiano, controlled ALF's facial and ear movements via a radio control offscreen. During tapings, Fusco wore a head-mounted microphone to record ALF's voice. The process resulted in numerous mistakes and retakes, making it impossible to record ALF in front of a live audience. A laugh track was added during post-production.

To avoid wear and tear on the principal ALF puppet, the performers rehearsed with a crude early version of ALF, nicknamed "RALF" for "Rehearsal Alien Life Form"). Fusco did not like to rehearse, and often substituted his hand or RALF for the real ALF puppet during rehearsals. In an interview on Late Night with Conan O'Brien, Tina Fey said that her biggest frustration as producer of NBC's 75th-anniversary special was dealing with ALF's "people". Fey said Fusco would only allow ALF to appear on the show if the puppeteers were hidden from everyone else. After ALF's cameo alongside former Family Ties star Michael Gross, ALF disappeared through a hole in the riser, was stuffed into a case, and immediately removed from the building.

While a puppet was usually used for ALF, there were some shots of the tiny alien running or walking around. This was accomplished by the 2 feet 9 inches (84 cm) actor Michu Meszaros wearing an ALF costume. This can be seen in one of the series' intros, which concludes with the Tanner family getting their picture taken; ALF (played by Meszaros) walks over to be part of the photo. However, Meszaros' services became too costly as well as time-consuming, and the full ALF costume was abandoned after the first season.

ALF scored its highest ratings during Season 2 (reaching tenth place in the Nielsen ratings). Ratings remained at a steady fifteenth place during Season 3, but plummeted to 39th place during Season 4. NBC moved the show from its traditional Monday night slot to Saturday in March 1990 and eventually moved to Sunday, but ratings continued to fall.

The season-ending cliffhanger "Consider Me Gone" became an unintentional series finale when NBC gave Alien Productions a verbal commitment for a fifth season, but ultimately withdrew its support. ABC resolved the cliffhanger on February 17, 1996, with the TV movie Project: ALF. NBC executive Brandon Tartikoff later told Fusco that the network regretted cancelling ALF prematurely, saying "It was a big mistake that we cancelled your show, because you guys had at least one or two more seasons left."

=== Censorship ===
Fusco commented in 2007 that his most enjoyable experience on ALF was sitting in the writers' room and pitching jokes while pushing the limit on what NBC censors would allow. Fusco commented that, "the greatest things were the jokes we couldn't put in the show." Specifically, puns dealing with ALF eating cats and other pets were problematic after NBC reported that a child placed a cat in a microwave and killed it after watching the show. In the pilot episode "A.L.F.", ALF is seen consuming a beer with Brian. Fusco defended the premise saying that "ALF is 285 years old, he can drink beer, he's old enough." (Although, in the "Help Me, Rhonda" episode, ALF gives his age as 227, and the writing in later episodes confirms this.) However, as ALF became more popular with children, NBC told Fusco "you can't have him drinking; the kids are watching, it's a bad role model." Even though Fusco believed that ALF was "an adult: he can do it", the alcohol consumption concept was discarded by the end of the first season, with the exception of the episode "Tequila" where he inspires an alcoholic to check into rehab after a night of drinking with her and making her think he was a hallucination. The cat-eating concept carried sporadically into the second season, with references including the "wedding cat" in the episode "Wedding Bell Blues", the Melmacian equivalent of a wedding cake.

For the hour-long season 1 episode, "Try to Remember", originally broadcast on February 9, 1987, ALF tries to simulate a jacuzzi by bringing Kate's electric mixer into the bathtub, thus receiving an electrical shock that caused amnesia. Fusco ended the original episode with a public service announcement from ALF, warning of the danger of mixing water and electricity. Despite this, NBC reported that a child attempted to recreate the scenario and nearly electrocuted himself (Fusco confirmed that the child was unharmed); Fusco was forced to refilm the opening sequence, replacing the electric mixer with a manual egg beater. ALF's amnesia is instead caused by a cranial concussion received after slipping in the shower (a scream and "thud" is heard rather than a "zap"), with all mentions of being shocked either overdubbed with new dialogue or deleted entirely (including ALF's public service announcement). This edited version was used for a fall 1988 rebroadcast, as well as all future U.S. and Canadian syndicated airings.

In 2010, blooper footage surfaced in which ALF was made to deliver racial jokes and sexual comments. He was actually mocking a then-recent episode of L.A. Law dealing with Tourette syndrome. Asked to comment, producer Steve Lamar stated that the footage was from an era when things were not so "ridiculously PC".

== International broadcast history ==
In France, ALF aired on Antenne 2 in 1988.

ALF was popular in West Germany after it began airing on ZDF. The actor who dubbed ALF's voice in German, Tommi Piper, recorded two albums and four singles as ALF between 1988 and 1991. In Italy, ALF aired on Rai 2 in 1988. In New Zealand, the entire series (and the movie) were screened on TV2. In the United Kingdom it was broadcast on CITV. In The Netherlands the series was broadcast initially between 1986 and 1990 by the TROS, later reruns were aired by RTL 5 and Veronica.

In the Philippines, the show aired on GMA Network with a simulcast on ABS-CBN and RPN-9 from 1986 to 1990. It moved to ABC-5, where it aired while dubbed in Tagalog from 1999 to 2002. In Guatemala, the show started to be aired in 1988 on Canal 3 as part of its night schedule the show was aired from 1988 to 1997 and briefly from 1999 to 2001 on Trecevisión as part of the afternoon schedule. During the initial airing from 1988 to 1994, the series was highly praised and earned a respectable rating amongst the TV viewers. In fact, Guatemala was the first country of Central America to air the show.

== Home media ==
=== United States and Canada ===
==== Lionsgate syndicated DVD release ====
Between 2004 and 2006, Lionsgate Home Entertainment (under license from Paul Fusco and Brillstein/Grey Communications) released all four seasons of ALF on DVD in Region 1. All releases contained syndicated versions, with running times of 21 minutes, compared to the original length of 24 minutes. Episodes are arranged in production order, rather than broadcast order. However, the 60-minute episodes "Try to Remember" and "ALF's Special Christmas" (from season one and season two, respectively), were presented in their original hour-long formats (though "Try to Remember" was presented in its censored version and "ALF's Special Christmas" has a minor scene using the song "Santa Claus Is Coming To Town" excised). The 60-minute episode "Tonight, Tonight", however, was split into two parts for syndication. The season four episode "Make 'Em Laugh" was presented in nearly its original length, with a single line of dialogue edited out.

The "To Be Continued..." disclaimer was also removed from the series finale, "Consider Me Gone", as NBC canceled ALF after its initial airing. In addition, most copyrighted music was excised from selected shows, shortening the running time by up to six minutes.

Lionsgate insisted that they had to utilize syndicated versions for the DVD release of ALF, saying it would be cost-prohibitive to remaster the original NBC-TV broadcast versions for release. This resulted in heavy criticism.

DVD name	Ep #	Release date	Additional information
Season One	25	August 10, 2004	Original Un-Aired Pilot; Gag/Outtakes Reel; ALF Trivia Facts; The hour-long episode "Try to Remember" is the censored version.
Season Two	25	August 23, 2005	Contains the first episode of ALF: The Animated Series and the first episode of ALF Tales
Season Three	25	May 30, 2006	Contains all Season 3 episodes, though not in original broadcast order. "Mind Games" and "Fever" were produced for Season 3, but did not air until Season 4.
Season Four	24	September 5, 2006	The episode "Make 'Em Laugh" runs 23:27 and is nearly unedited, with a single line of dialogue edited out.

Video Service Corporation previously released two other DVDs of ALF. The ALF Files was released exclusively in Canada on November 1, 2002. The hour-long episodes "Try to Remember", "ALF's Special Christmas" and "Tonight, Tonight" were presented in their original hour-long format. "Try to Remember", however, contains the re-edited version pertaining to ALF's electric shock in the bathtub.

On September 13, 2005, Project: ALF was released. Both DVDs featured optional commentary by creator Paul Fusco, with co-creator Tom Patchett joining him on the first release.

==== Shout! Factory restored DVD release ====
On February 24, 2022, it was announced that Shout! Factory acquired the distribution rights to the series. Shout set up an "ALFtv" YouTube channel, posting several full episodes in their syndicated versions, and clips from others. On June 24, Shout presented the original uncut versions of fan-favorite episodes, with new commentary from Pratchett and Fusco (the latter in-character as ALF).

This was followed on October 17, 2023, by Shout's released of a new DVD box set, containing ALF, ALF: The Animated Series, ALF Tales, and Project: ALF, all in their original restored broadcast versions, with the exception of the one-hour episodes "Try to Remember" and "Tonight, Tonight".

Both episodes underwent restoration to their authentic durations and were not subjected to syndication-related truncation necessitated by time constraints. However, "Try to Remember" was sourced from the Fall 1988 rebroadcast censored version, wherein ALF's electrical shock scene was substituted with his fall in the bathtub. "Tonight, Tonight" was presented in its two-part version rather than the original one-hour format.

DVD name	Ep #	Release date	Additional information
ALF: The Complete Series (Deluxe Edition)	99	October 17, 2023	24 DVDs; 98 unedited episodes; one censored ("Try to Remember"), two-part version ("Tonight, Tonight") (1986–90); ALF: The Animated Series (1987–89); ALF Tales (1988–89); Project ALF (made-for-television film) (1996); "A Look Back at ALF with Creators Paul Fusco and Tom Patchett" feature; Audio commentaries with ALF and Tom Patchett on select episodes

In Canada, all four seasons of ALF appear on Amazon Prime.

In the U.S., all four seasons of ALF appear on Peacock, as of June 11, 2023.

=== Europe ===
Warner Home Video, which is now Warner Brothers Discovery Home Entertainment released the first season of ALF in Germany on September 4, 2009, and in the Netherlands and France on September 9. The DVDs are in PAL format, with English-language menus. The language selections available are English, French, German, and Spanish (except for season 2 which, despite being dubbed, oddly doesn't feature Spanish, and the episode "Tonight, Tonight" which had not dubbed into German), with subtitles available in French, Dutch, Spanish, English, and German. The series was released on HBO Max on April 26, 2022, in Spain and July 12, 2022 in Nordics and Portugal.

The episodes span four discs and are uncut, unlike their American-edited counterparts, with a few exceptions:

- A scene from "For Your Eyes Only" where ALF and friend Jody are singing "Ragtime Cowboy Joe" and "The Chipmunk Song (Christmas Don't Be Late)" by Alvin and the Chipmunks was removed because of music copyright issues with Bagdasarian Productions, owners of the Chipmunks franchise.
- The censored version of "Try to Remember" was utilized, removing the mention of electrocution.
- The syndicated version of "Somewhere Over the Rerun" (a.k.a. "The Ballad of Gilligan's Island") was utilized, though the Gilligan's Island theme was retained.
- The series finale "Consider Me Gone" retained the "To Be Continued..." caption seen during its original March 1990 broadcast.

DVD name	Ep #	Release date	Additional information
Season One	26	September 4, 2009	Contains all 26 episodes from season one: No bonus features; Almost all original music; Unedited episodes, except "For Your Eyes Only" and "Try to Remember"
Season Two	26	December 11, 2009	Contains all 26 episodes from season two: No bonus features; All original music; Unedited episodes, except for "Somewhere Over the Rerun"
Season Three	26	June 25, 2010	Contains all 26 episodes from season three: No bonus features; All original music; Unedited episodes
Season Four	24	October 15, 2010	Contains all 24 episodes from season four: No bonus features; All original music; Unedited episodes

=== Oceania ===
In Region 4, Warner Home Video released the first two seasons of ALF on DVD in Australia and New Zealand on April 7, 2010. Seasons 3 and 4 have yet to get released in Region 4.

=== Latin America ===
On December 22, 2021, ALF was released on HBO Max in Latin America and Brazil, respectively.

== Awards ==
In the U.S., ALF has won numerous awards. In 1987, the show won a People's Choice Award for Favorite New TV Comedy Program; in 1988 it won Favorite Show at the Kids' Choice Awards; and at the 1989 Kids' Choice Awards, ALF himself won Favorite TV Actor. Benji Gregory and Andrea Elson were also nominated in various Young Actor categories for their work on ALF at the Young Artist Awards during 1987–1989, with the show receiving a nomination for Best Family Television Series.

== Syndication ==
Reruns of ALF entered off-network syndication in September 1990, an arrangement that later became less frequent on most local stations, until September 1995. Repeats of the show debuted on cable in 1999 on the Odyssey Network, remaining on the schedule after Hallmark took full control and airing until 2002. It also ran on Nick at Nite for a short time in 2001, and aired on the Hub Network from June 4, 2012, to October 12, 2014. It aired on MeTV from May 2017 until May 2020. From January 2, 2023 to December 27, 2025, the show has aired on Laff. It has also aired on Catchy Comedy on occasional weekends, and has since been added to the regular schedule on January 2, 2026, airing early Saturday mornings at 5am & 5:30am EST. It can be streamed on several streaming services, such as Peacock, Tubi, and Freevee.

== Spin-offs and related programming ==
=== Animated series ===
To capitalize on the success of the series, a spin-off animated series was produced, airing Saturday mornings on NBC. ALF: The Animated Series, set on ALF's home planet of Melmac, ran from 1987 to 1988 and was produced by DIC Entertainment. This was a prequel series, set on Melmac before the planet exploded. The show focused on ALF, his family, his friends, and his girlfriend Rhonda and their various exploits. Each episode was book-ended by a live-action sequence involving ALF talking to the television viewers, setting up the episode, and commenting on it afterward. When the cartoon entered its second season, it was paired in a one-hour block with its own spin-off ALF Tales, which took Gordon and the cast of characters from season one, and recast them as characters from assorted classic fairy tales.

Select episodes of both shows are included as special features on the ALF: Season 2 DVD as well as the cartoon-specific releases ALF Animated Adventures – 20,000 Years in Driving School and Other Stories and ALF and The Beanstalk and Other Classic Fairy Tales.

The animated version of ALF also appeared in Cartoon All-Stars to the Rescue.

=== Made-for-TV movie sequel ===
After the end of the series, a made-for-television movie was produced, in 1996, intending to give the series a proper end. Project: ALF starts right after the series final episode but, especially because of the absence of the Tanners, it failed at obtaining success.

=== ALF's Hit Talk Show ===
In July to November of 2004, ALF's Hit Talk Show debuted on American cable channel TV Land, which featured ALF as a Johnny Carson-type TV talk-show host and co-starring Ed McMahon as his sidekick. Guests included Drew Carey, Tom Green, and Merv Griffin. It ran for seven episodes.

=== Failed reboots ===
On May 21, 2012, Paul Fusco said he was pitching an ALF movie. In August 2012, it was reported that Sony Pictures Animation had acquired the rights to ALF and would develop the property into a CGI-live action hybrid feature. The Smurfs producer Jordan Kerner would also produce the film, along with Tom Patchett and Paul Fusco. However, nothing further has since been announced.

On August 1, 2018, Warner Bros. announced it would produce an ALF reboot. The reboot would have likely focused on ALF returning to Earth, with a new family and characters. In November 2018, Warner reported that it had canceled the reboot.

== See also ==
- Project: ALF (1996), a TV movie that begins where the final episode of ALF ended
- 3rd Rock from the Sun (1996)
- Mork & Mindy (1978)
- Resident Alien (2021)
