= ALF Tales =

American animated series

- Genre: Comedy; Fantasy
- Created by: Paul Fusco; Tom Patchett
- Directed by: Kevin Altieri (season 1); David Feiss (season 2)
- Voices of: Paul Fusco; Peggy Mahon; Paulina Gillis; Thick Wilson; Dan Hennessey; Rob Cowan; Ellen-Ray Hennessy; Noam Zylberman
- Country of origin: United States
- Original language: English
- No. of seasons: 2
- No. of episodes: 21

Production
- Running time: 30 minutes
- Production companies: DIC Animation City; Saban Entertainment; Alien Productions

Original release
- Network: NBC
- Release: September 10, 1988 – December 9, 1989

ALF Tales is a 30-minute Saturday morning animated series that aired on NBC from September 10, 1988, to December 9, 1989. The show is a spin-off of ALF: The Animated Series that featured characters from that series playing various characters from fairy tales. The fairy tale parody was usually altered for comedic effect in a manner akin to Jay Ward's "Fractured Fairy Tales".

== Plot ==
The episodes were performed in the style of a resident theater company or ensemble cast where Gordon "ALF" Shumway and Rhonda would take the leading male and female roles, Larson Petty and Sloop take on villain roles, and the other characters were cast according to their characteristics.

Many stories spoof a film genre, such as the "Cinderella" episode which is presented like an Elvis Presley film. Some episodes featured a "fourth wall" effect where Gordon is backstage preparing for the episode and Rob Cowan would appear drawn as a TV executive (who introduced himself as "Roger Cowan, network executive") who tries to brief Gordon on how to improve the episode. For instance, Cowan once told Gordon who was readying for a medieval themed episode that "less than 2% of our audience lives in the Dark Ages".

The earlier episodes deal with the live-action ALF as he does a mailbag segment answering fan mail from fictional people.

== Episodes ==
=== Season 1 (1988–89) ===
| No. overall | No. in season | Title | Written by | Original release date |
|---|---|---|---|---|
| 1 | 1 | "Robin Hood" | David Steven Cohen & Roger S.H. Schulman | September 10, 1988 |
Gordon portrays Robin Hood, leading a jazz band called "Ye Merry Men" consisting of Little John, Friar Tuck (portrayed by Rick who keeps mixing up his lines with those from Little Red Riding Hood), Will Scarlet, and Alan-a-Dale. They oppose the unjust taxes and raids on peasants that are led by the Sheriff of Nottingham (portrayed by Larson Petty) and Prince John (portrayed by Sloop). Robin Hood's group sneaks into Nottingham Castle to rescue Maid Marian (portrayed by Rhonda), using their jazz music to disarm the guards, who are unexpectedly sympathetic. When King Richard returns from his book-signing tour, he punishes Prince John and the Sheriff by making them watch the Home Shopping Network for ten years.
| 2 | 2 | "Sleeping Beauty" | David Steven Cohen & Roger S.H. Schulman | September 17, 1988 |
Gordon takes on the role of Sleeping Beauty. A witch, angered by the King and Queen (portrayed by Bob and Flo), curses their newborn with a fatal papercut. Three wizards (portrayed by Rick, Skip, and Curtis) arrive to bless the baby. One wizard counters the curse with a sleeping spell. King Bob responds by outlawing paper in his kingdom and promotes television over reading. Sixteen years later, a bored teenage prince reads a smuggled newspaper and gets a paper cut. A princess (portrayed by Rhonda) must defeat the witch with the help of the three wizards.
| 3 | 3 | "Cinderella" | David Steven Cohen & Roger S.H. Schulman | September 24, 1988 |
Based in 1962, "Gordo Shumway" portrays a rock star akin to Elvis Presley in search of love. The stepfamily of Cinderella (portrayed by Rhonda) consisting of wicked stepmother Tillie Fitzgerald and stepsisters Janet and La Toya obtains tickets to his concert, where he plans to choose a bride. Feeling disheartened, Cinderella receives a wish from her fairy godmother "which he can't refuse." At the concert, Gordo performs his hit song, and Cinderella impresses him with a spontaneous duet, culminating in a high note that breaks all the glass in the auditorium. Determined to find the woman who can shatter a glass slipper, Gordo searches until he discovers Cinderella.
| 4 | 4 | "The Legend of Sleepy Hollow" | David Steven Cohen & Roger S.H. Schulman | October 1, 1988 |
Gordon plays Ichabod Crane, a photographer applicant at the Daily Hemisphere in Sleepy Hollow run by the editor-in-chief Baltus Van Tassel (portrayed by Larson Petty). He meets Baltus's daughter Katrina, worker Hendrick (portrayed by Rick), and tough worker Brom Bones. On his first assignment, Icabod is assigned to photograph the Headless Horseman. During a date with Katrina, he is chased by the Headless Horseman, who warns him away. Ichabod, spurred by the full moon, pursues multiple Headless Horsemen, discovering they are impostors led by Baultus, Brom Bones, Hendrick, a treasurer, and some unnamed townspeople who were doing it for various reasons. Eventually, he flees with Katrina only to be pursued by a genuinely frightening Headless Horseman as Icabod and Katrina flee to Icabod's hometown of Brooklyn.
| 5 | 5 | "Jack and the Beanstalk" | David Steven Cohen & Roger S.H. Schulman | October 8, 1988 |
Gordon plays Jack Bates (Norman Bates's son) who, in an effort to save their struggling motel, trades the family cow for three magic beans from a hooded man on the run. His mother throws them out the window later that night. Overnight, the beans grow into a massive beanstalk. Climbing it, Jack finds a giant named J. Mason with a hen that lays golden eggs. Jack steals the hen to renovate the motel. When a beautiful guest named Pippi Lee Sing arrives, Jack is captured by two men (portrayed by Larson Petty and Sloop) and taken to J. Mason alongside the hen who talks about his plan to use the hen to take over the village. Fortunately, Pippi, actually a secret agent, rescues him. They escape with the hen, cutting down the beanstalk, and defeating J. Mason. Jack and Pippi marry and leave with the hen by train. The story parodies Alfred Hitchcock's works, with nods to Psycho, Vertigo and Rear Window.
| 6 | 6 | "The Aladdin Brothers and Their Lamp" | David Steven Cohen & Roger S.H. Schulman | October 15, 1988 |
The episode begins with Gordon scolding Skip over turning off his alarm clock while talking to a girl named Clarissa about getting her a part in ALF Tales. Inspired by the One Thousand and One Nights, Gordon and Skip play Ziggy and Roy Aladdin, a struggling duo who discover a magic lamp after being taken to its location by a "lowly magician" (portrayed by Larson Petty) and getting trapped in the ruins by him. The Johnny Carson-like genie inside transports them to Sheboygan, where they face trouble for catching sight of the princess (portrayed by Rhonda). The princess is visited by different suitors as the "lowly magician" is actually the Royal Magician for the Sultan. After overcoming challenges and exposing a plot against the Sultan by the Royal Magician who was responsible for imprisoning the genie in his lamp, they win favor and marry the princess and Clarissa portraying the other girl upon getting the part from Gordon.
| 7 | 7 | "Rapunzel" | David Steven Cohen & Roger S.H. Schulman | October 29, 1988 |
The Wicked Witch controls all media in the country, offering limited content on Witch TV and censoring rap music. Rapunzel (portrayed by Rhonda) experiences her family on the Witch's rigged television quiz show, leading to her imprisonment. Prince Gordon and his rap friends rescue Rapunzel from the forest and return to advocate for media reform. They persuade the king to limit media ownership and establish a commission to prevent monopolies.
| 8 | 8 | "Rumplestilskin" | Eddie Gorodetsky | November 12, 1988 |
Presented like a Dashiell Hammett novel, Gordon plays the Humphrey Bogart-like Sam Shovel Private Eye who has a history with stage fright. A miller's daughter makes a deal with a "bizarre strange imp of a man" (portrayed by Sloop) to spin straw into gold to impress King Bundy. There is a catch afterwards....unless she discovers the imp's name in 24 hours he will claim her first born child. The miller's daughter hires Sam Shovel to find his name Rumplestilskin while avoiding the police and he does so in the nick of time. Rumplestiltskin is arrested by the police lieutenant for turning straw into gold which has been destabilizing the currency markets of the different kingdoms. King Budy overlooks the fact that the miller's daughter can't do what Rumplestiltskin can do as she has shown compassion. With Sam departing after conquering his stage fright, King Bundy, the miller, the police lieutenant, and Rumplestiltskin are sad to see him go. Sam then returns as the chef who tells everyone that the roast for dinner is ready. NOTE: Last episode with a mailbag segment. Unfortunately, ALF doesn't read the letter because his agent Mark wants him to be on an episode of The Golden Girls which Gloria Estefan is also going to guest star.
| 9 | 9 | "The Princess and the Pea" | Michael Rowe | November 19, 1988 |
Prince Gordy would rather be a stand-up comic on the David Letterock Show hosted by David Letterock (a caricature of David Letterman) than a prince but the Queen chooses a short, overweight, precocious princess for him to marry. Meanwhile, Gordy misses his chance to perform before Letterock, but he impresses Avery Fisher-Hall, the waitress in the comedy café who is really a princess. Gordy tells the Queen that he wants to marry Avery so she demands that Avery must pass the mattress test to prove she is a princess before she can marry the prince - and she does.
| 10 | 10 | "John Henry" | Ellis Weiner | December 3, 1988 |
Gordon play John Henry, a master chef with his TV show, Eatie Gourmet who focusses on hand preparation of his meals. His competitor, the mad chef Art Cuisine (portrayed by Larson Petty) and his assistant Ethan (portrayed by Sloop), invent the K-Art mechanical food processor as part of his plot to take over the world. A competition to see who can serve the most six-course meals is held, with John Henry's old-fashioned methods being extremely slow and losing to K-Art's rapid ways. Henry fades into obscurity and Cuisine becomes prominent with everyone in America now owning the K-Art Chopper. However, during a dinner at the White House, the President is disgusted with the processed food of the K-Art Chopper and demands tomato roses, which only John Henry knew how to make. Art Cuisine activates all K-Art Choppers to transform into killer robots to take over of all of America and depose the President. When all seems lost, John Henry returns and destroys the robots using his hand tools. As a reward for saving his life and with Art and Ethan arrested, the President appoints John Henry the White House's Chef. This features a parody or spoof of the H. G. Wells book The War of the Worlds and features a Caricature of Bob Dylan as a folk singer.
| 11 | 11 | "The Three Little Pigs" | Mitchell Kriegman | December 10, 1988 |
Rick, Skip, and Alf play the respective trio (Ernie, Chip, and Robbie) in a twist on the classic story where a business developer (portrayed by Sloop) hires the Big Bad Wolf (portrayed by Larson Petty) to destroy their houses. The beginning and ending scenes parody The Twilight Zone. Also, the straw is switched to soup cans.
| 12 | 12 | "Alice in Wonderland" | Alicia Marie Schudt | December 17, 1988 |
Gordon doesn't want to do the story, but everyone else does. As he begins to get ready, he falls asleep and a humanoid rabbit named Blanche du Lapine steals his birthday present for Rhonda. Gordon follows her down an elevator shaft and through a cat door to Wonderland featuring obnoxious flowers, a Pee-wee Herman version of Humpty Dumpty, a Wooster-Chestercat, a saxophone-playing caterpillar (possibly played by Skip), the Tweedle Sisters (Dee is changed to Blonde), the The Mad Catter and the March Hare (portrayed by Rick and Larson Petty), and a very awful Queen. In the end, Blanche reveals herself to be Rhonda, the whole thing was an un-birthday surprise for Gordon, the whole thing was a dream.
| 13 | 13 | "Peter Pan" | Bradley Kesden & Skip Shepard | January 7, 1989 |
Peter Pan (Gordon) and Tinker Bell (Neep) take Wendy (Rhonda) and her siblings to Never-Never land. Meanwhile, Captain Hook (portrayed by Larson Petty) is a stand-up pirate comedian who see Peter Pan as a rival of his. Wendy fancies Peter, but becomes frustrated when she is treated like a maid by Peter and the Lost Boys, and tells them all to "grow up". In order to find Peter's secret location, Hook captures Tinkerbell who resents Wendy's arrival. Hook then kidnaps Wendy and the others, but Tinker Bell escapes and warns Peter who comes to their rescue. Peter decides to "grow up" and after returning to England with Wendy and the others, he opens a burger joint with Hook called "Pan & Hook". This features a caricature of Michael "Crocodile" Dundee as the crocodile.

=== Season 2 (1989) ===
| No. overall | No. in season | Title | Written by | Original release date |
|---|---|---|---|---|
| 14 | 1 | "Hansel & Gretel" | Story by Steve Roberts, teleplay by Bradley Kesden & Skip Shepard | September 16, 1989 |
Gordon plays a plump Bavarian boy with a large appetite, Hansel and Rhonda plays his sister Gretel. They get lost in the forest and end up at Camp Eat-a-Kid. The resident witch fattens up Hansel while Gretel is thrown into a cell with Simon and Theodore – Alvin has disappeared. They get free but are recaptured so they put Hansel through a rigorous fitness program to lose weight. This time, they escape and the witch is arrested. There's a parody or spoof of Alvin and the Chipmunks and caricatures of Mr. T as Mr. Tree and The Monkees as The New Donkees.
| 15 | 2 | "The Wizard of Oz" | Story by Steve Roberts, teleplay by Bradley Kesden & Skip Shepard | September 23, 1989 |
Set in East Velcro back in the era of Black and White TV, Gordon is selling encyclopedias door-to-door when a tornado lifts up the family's farmhouse and he lands in the colorful 60s along the Mellow Brick Road. He lands on a witch and her magical ruby high-top sneakers attaches themselves to his feet. He heads along the road to find the Wizard of Oz to remove them. Meanwhile, the Wicked Witch casts faulty spells in an effort to retrieve them. He encounters a trio consisting of Tin, Straw, and Fur who join him and the travel to the Cubic Zirconia City where they're caught by the Wicked Witch of the West. Gordon challenges her to a game of basketball. When she gets covered in milk during the game, she melts away and he returns home to live with the Good Witch and star in his own sitcom. This features a parody or spoof of counterculture of the 1960s, and a caricature of Bill Cosby as the Wizard of Oz.
| 16 | 3 | "The Elves and the Shoemaker" | Richard J. Schellbach | September 30, 1989 |
In the village of Birkenstock, Melmac's lower east side, two elves from "Elves-R-Us" are sent to help the struggling shoe store of Donald Tramp (portrayed by Petty Larson) and his wife Imelda (portrayed by Sloop). The elves make shoes which Tramp sells for a high price, and each night they do the same routine until the store becomes very successful. He expands his business to become the richest man in the land, however the elves feel exploited and go on strike. A special agent of the Impartial Mediators Federation (IMF), Gordon, is assigned to resolve the situation and he approaches Tramp but has no success. Meanwhile the new automated production line malfunctions and faulty shoes threaten to overwhelm the factory. Gordo/Gordon finds a solution where Tramp is arrested and Imelda takes over the production as she leaves Tramp for Shumway. This features a parody or spoof of Mission Impossible.
| 17 | 4 | "The Emperor's New Clothes" | Story by Phil Harnage, teleply by Ellis Weiner | October 14, 1989 |
The emperor demands some new clothes for an upcoming Label Day parade. The prime minister, Lord Bloomingdale (played by Snout) grouses that he must spent most of his time presenting clothes and has hardly any energy left over to solve any governmental issues. Gordon plays a wannabe clothes designer named Beneton Espirit who, joins Coco Klein's fashion house where he meets the beautiful model Christy Dinkly (portrayed by Rhonda). However, his casual sportswear look is soundly rejected by the emperor. He tries again as a masked fashion designer named Guess Who. When he appears to have no pants, Guess says his pants are made of invisible Schmatex. The Emperor demands that his new outfit be made of Schmatex and when he walks through the streets the ruse is revealed along with his nakedness. However, Beneton has a change of heart and presents the emperor with one of his clothes from his actual line, a simple shirt and pair of chinos. Having learned his lesson on vanity, the emperor donates his excessive wardrobe to the poor. This happens to be a parody or spoof of the fashion industry and haute couture.
| 18 | 5 | "Goldilocks & the Three Bears" | Phil Harnage & Judy Rothman | October 28, 1989 |
Mayor Bear and his family have to go away on business, so they contract Rhonda's house-sitting service to look after their Malizoo beach house while they're away, including their special possessions, their canine Studs and very special vibrating beds. However, Rhonda gets a better offer and asks Goldilocks (portrayed by Gordon) to do the job. Gordon and his friends decide to turn the place into an amusement park to earn some extra money, but they are busted by the police department's corrupt police officers (portrayed by Larson Petty and Sloop) who confiscate the house's contents. Desperate, Goldilocks uses his profits to buy the furniture back from the police officers, but when the Bears return, they detect that someone has been using their furniture and beds. Eventually everything is resolved, although the Bears contemplate starting a folk band called the Moma and the Poppa. This features a parody or spoof of Southern California youth culture and their social dialect.
| 19 | 6 | "Little Red Riding Hood" | Bradley Kesden & Skip Shepard | November 11, 1989 |
Gordon plays a Courier called Red who has to deliver a package to Grandma who happens to be a scientist in order for her to complete her shrinking and enlarging device. However, the Big Bad Wolf (portrayed by Larson Petty) gets there first and shrinks them as he then swallows grandma. Red arrives and the Wolf shrinks and swallows him too. However, Grandma and Red end up in the McStomach and start a food fight which gives the Big Bad Wolf a stomachache and he burps them up. They get free and complete the assembly of Grandma's device, shrinking the Big Bad Wolf and returning themselves to normal size. This features a parody or spoof of Honey I Shrunk the Kids.
| 20 | 7 | "Snow White and the Seven Dwarfs" | Judy Rothman | December 2, 1989 |
The story of Snow White and the Seven Dwarfs is presented as an episode of Unsolved Mysteries by Gordon as Robert Stuck. Snow White (portrayed by Rhonda), a keen skier, disappears after winning a ski competition and beating the Wicked Queen. The Wicked Queen used to ask her ski instructor Mario de la Wall "who is the fairest skier", and after he answered "Snow White" she disappeared. She was last seen in the company of a thug for hire (portrayed by Bob) who was tasked by the Wicked Queen to cut off her fingers and toes. However, the thug takes pity on her and tells her to head to the forest. Stuck says the thug was seen at a joke shop where he acquired funny fingers, giving those to the Wicked Queen as a ploy. Snow White heads to "The middle of Nowhere" where she finds a condo rented by seven dwarf ski bums. Besides skiing, her passion is cleaning and is soon appreciated by the dwarves for making their quarters pleasant. The Wicked Queen resumes her vendetta when she realizes she was tricked. While the dwarves are away at work, Snow White bites a poisonous apple left by the Wicked Queen and goes into a deep sleep. The dwarfs enter her in the "Date Connection Show". All the male skiers try to kiss her, but their lips are chapped. Robert Stuck is ineligible as he is not a skier, so he masters the green circle slope and kisses her, thus being the one to awaken her and marry her. Stuck states that if anyone knows the whereabouts of the Wicked Queen, they should call the Hi-Ho Police at 1-800-555-BUST-A-QUEEN. When the Wicked Queen surrenders and declares that Snow White is the fairest, Mario de la Wall states that Judge Waffler on The People's Trial is the fairest. The Wicked Queen is then arrested as she quotes "I can live with that". This features a parody or spoof of dating game shows and a caricature of Robert Stack from Unsolved Mysteries.
| 21 | 8 | "King Midas" | Phil Harnage and Bradley Kesden & Skip Shepard | December 9, 1989 |
Oklahoma Jones (portrayed by Gordon) goes in search of King Midas, but he is captured by the evil Professor Bouquet (portrayed by Larson Petty) and his minion (portrayed by Sloop) who steal his map. It appears that Midas made a fortune franchising camel mufflers and a grateful client granted him the power to turn everything he touched into gold. Jones travels to Midas Land and finds King Midas and decides to help remove the spell by finding a magic coffee mug. This features a parody or spoof of Indiana Jones and Midas automotive service centers.

== Voice cast ==
- Paul Fusco as Gordon "ALF" Shumway, Rick Fusterman
- Paulina Gillis) as Augie Shumway, Rhonda
- Peggy Mahon as Flo Shumway
- Thick Wilson as Larson Petty, Bob Shumway
- Dan Hennessey as Sloop
- Rob Cowan as Skip
- Ellen-Ray Hennessy as Stella the Waitress
- Noam Zylberman as Curtis Shumway (1988)
- Michael Fantini as Curtis Shumway (1989)

== Home media ==
The first seven episodes were released on DVD on May 30, 2006, in Region 1 from Lionsgate Home Entertainment in a single-disc release entitled ALF and The Beanstalk and Other Classic Fairy Tales.

The complete series was remastered and subsequently released on October 17, 2023, by Shout! Factory in the DVD box set ALF: The Complete Series (Deluxe Edition). The box set release also included the original 1986–90 sitcom, ALF: The Animated Series and Project: ALF.

== See also ==
- List of animated spinoffs from prime time shows
