= Project ALF =

1996 film by Dick Lowry

Project: ALF
- DVD cover
- Genre: Comedy; Sci-fi; Family
- Based on: ALF by: Paul Fusco; Tom Patchett
- Written by: Tom Patchett; Paul Fusco
- Directed by: Dick Lowry
- Starring: Paul Fusco; Miguel Ferrer; William O'Leary; Jensen Daggett; John Schuck; Ed Begley Jr. Ray Walston; Martin Sheen
- Music by: Mark Snow
- Country of origin: United States
- Original language: English

Production
- Executive producers: Paul Fusco; Kenneth Kaufman
- Producers: Tom Patchett; Wolf Bauer
- Cinematography: Henry M. Lebo
- Editor: William B. Stich
- Running time: 95 minutes
- Production companies: Alien Productions; Patchett Kaufman Entertainment; Paul Fusco Productions; UFA Fernsehproduktion GmbH; World International Network

Original release
- Network: ABC
- Release: February 17, 1996

Project: ALF is a 1996 American made-for-television science fiction comedy film directed by Dick Lowry which serves as a sequel to the final episode "Consider Me Gone" of the 1986–1990 sitcom ALF as well as bringing the character's story to a conclusion. It was broadcast in the U.S. by ABC and in Canada on CHCH-TV on February 17, 1996. The film was released on DVD in 2005 and on Blu-ray in 2023.

The only actors to appear in both the series and film were Paul Fusco (the voice and puppeteer of ALF, who also co-wrote and co-executive produced the film) and Beverly Archer (who played Mrs. Byrd on the TV series and Dr. Carnage in the film).

== Plot ==
Having been captured by the US Air Force's Alien Task Force (ATF) while attempting escape from Earth, Gordon Shumway, also known as ALF, has been detained at Edmonds Air Force Base under the orders of Colonel Gilbert Milfoil, the ATF's head of security; despite others' fears, life there soon proves to be luxurious for him. Acting independently, Milfoil plans to kill ALF under the guise of a beauty treatment and leaves a paper trail implicating his aide-de-camp, Second Lieutenant Harold Reese. They discuss ALF's relationship with the Tanner family, who have moved to Iceland under the Witness Protection Program.

Upon learning of the plot, two Air Force scientists, Major Melissa Hill and Captain Rick Mullican, help ALF escape by hiding him in a cheap motel. Unwilling to give up his comforts, ALF sneaks out and contacts one of his former guards to arrange a supply drop before accidentally entering a strip club called the "Kitty Kat Lounge", which he mistakenly believes to be a restaurant that serves cats.

With both the local police and the military alerted, the trio turns to Dexter Moyers, a former NASA scientist who was falsely discredited by the government as part of an anti-UFO conspiracy. His solution is to publicly reveal ALF's existence on global television, removing the government's credibility and vindicating himself, but Mullican is uncomfortable with this. After discovering a computer file that hints at a deeper agenda, he leaves during the night. The next day, he contacts a friend at Edmonds, knowing that Milfoil will monitor the conversation and come to him directly. As he expected, he is arrested soon after and brokers a deal, arranging safe conduct for the fugitives in exchange for revealing the broadcast.

Meanwhile, Hill learns that Moyers has set up a secret auction alongside the broadcast, intending to sell ALF to the highest bidder, and he imprisons her after she refuses to participate. ALF, unaware of the betrayal, enjoys the attention until stage fright and his host's hostility lead him to lock himself in the bathroom, giving the military time to shut down the broadcast. Both Hill and ALF are arrested, and Milfoil reneges on the deal, unwittingly revealing his murderous intentions on a security recording that Reese obtains.

Back at Edmonds, Milfoil gloats that ALF's escape means he can convince his superiors to have him executed, with his hatred being revealed to be as payback for an alleged alien abduction that drove his mother insane. However, Reese interrupts a meeting between Milfoil and Lieutenant General Myron Stone, the Air Force's liaison to the Pentagon, to play the tape, revealing Milfoil's malfeasance.

A military panel authorizes promotions for the three officers involved in taking down Milfoil and apologizes to ALF before declaring him an ambassador to Earth. However, ALF's self-aggrandizing behavior leaves the panel to question whether they made the right choice.

== Cast ==
- Paul Fusco as ALF
- William O'Leary as Captain Dr. Rick Mullican
- Jensen Daggett as Major Dr. Melissa Hill
- Martin Sheen as Colonel Gilbert Milfoil
- Miguel Ferrer as Dexter Moyers
- Liz Coke as Nina
- Ray Walston as Motel Manager
- Ed Begley Jr. as Dr. Warner
- Beverly Archer as Dr. Carnage
- Scott Michael Campbell as Second Lieutenant Harold Reese
- Charlie Robinson as Dr. Stanley
- John Schuck as Lieutenant General Myron Stone
- Markus Redmond as Sergeant Rhomboid
- Erick Avari as Rocket (voice)
- Justin Lewis as himself
- Dell Yount as Dr. Mockton
- Michael Weatherred as Murphy
- Gregalan Williams as Police Officer
- Jeff Rawluk as Card Guard No.1
- Ahmet Zappa as Card Guard No. 2

== Production ==
Project: ALF aired on ABC, after NBC changed plans for the last season of ALF to have one extra episode so the storyline could be resolved with a two-part finale. The first half aired with "TO BE CONTINUED" notice, but the network did not produce any episodes and left the series on a cliffhanger for over five years. This meant that no plotlines were resolved such as Alf meeting the Tanners again or for his friends from Melmac arriving to rescue him.

The full original cast did not return for the film. William O'Leary and Jensen Daggett were already working together on ABC, playing husband and wife on Home Improvement.

== Home media ==
Project: ALF was remastered and subsequently released on October 17, 2023, by Shout! Factory in the DVD box set ALF: The Complete Series (Deluxe Edition). The box set release also included the original 1986–90 sitcom, ALF: The Animated Series and ALF Tales.
