= Cartoon All-Stars to the Rescue =

1990 animated TV film directed by Milton Gray

- Home video release poster
- Genre: Social guidance television film
- Written by: Duane Poole; Tom Swale
- Directed by: Milton Gray; Marsh Lamore; Bob Shellhorn; Mike Svayko
- Starring: The Smurfs, Alf, Garfield, Alvin, Simon, Theodore, Winnie the Pooh, Tigger, Muppet Babies, Slimer, Bugs Bunny, Daffy Duck, Michelangelo, Huey, Dewey and Louie
- Voices of: Ross Bagdasarian Jr.; Jeff Bergman; Townsend Coleman; Wayne Collins; Jim Cummings; Joey Dedio; Danny Goldman; Georgi Irene; Janice Karman; Aaron Lohr; Jason Marsden; Don Messick; Lorenzo Music; Laurie O'Brien; Lindsay Parker; George C. Scott; Russi Taylor; Frank Welker
- Music by: Richard Kosinski; Sam Winans; Paul Buckmaster; Bill Reichenbach; Bob Mann; Guy Moon; Alan Menken
- Country of origin: United States
- Original language: English

Production
- Executive producer: Roy E. Disney
- Producer: Buzz Potamkin
- Editor: Jay Bixsen
- Running time: 32 minutes
- Production companies: The Academy of Television Arts & Sciences Foundation; Southern Star Productions

Original release
- Network: ABC; NBC; Fox; CBS; USA Network; Nickelodeon; Syndication
- Release: April 21, 1990

Cartoon All-Stars to the Rescue is a 1990 American animated children's comedy-drama social guidance television special starring many characters from several animated television series at the time of its release. The plot follows Michael, a teenager who is using marijuana, leaving his family worried. When his younger sister Corey's piggy bank goes missing one morning, cartoon characters come to life from various items in her room and find it in Michael's room along with his stash of drugs, so they give him an intervention in the form of a fantasy journey to teach him the adverse consequences of drug use.

McDonald's released a VHS home video edition of the special distributed by Buena Vista Home Video, which opened with an introduction from President George H. W. Bush, First Lady Barbara Bush and their dog, Millie. It was produced by the Academy of Television Arts & Sciences Foundation and Southern Star Productions, and was animated overseas by Wang Film Productions. The musical number "Wonderful Ways to Say No" was written by Academy Award-winning composer Alan Menken and lyricist Howard Ashman, who also wrote the songs for Walt Disney Animation Studios' The Little Mermaid, Beauty and the Beast, and Aladdin.

Financed by McDonald's and benefiting Ronald McDonald Children's Charities, it was originally simulcast for a limited time on April 21, 1990, on all four major American television networks (by supporting their Saturday morning characters): ABC, CBS, NBC, and Fox, (Note: Fox did not have a Saturday morning schedule at the time, but would launch one that September.) and most independent stations, as well as various cable networks.

== Plot ==
An unseen person steals a piggy bank off the dresser in the bedroom of a young girl named Corey. The theft is witnessed by Papa Smurf, who emerges from a Smurfs comic book with the other Smurfs and alerts the different cartoon characters in the room: Alf from a picture, Garfield as a lamp, Alvin and the Chipmunks from a record sleeve, Winnie the Pooh as a stuffed animal, Baby Kermit as an alarm clock, and Slimer, who arrives through the wall.

Alf, Garfield, Alvin, Simon, and Theodore identify the thief: Michael, Corey's older brother, who has a box of marijuana hidden under his bed. Meanwhile, Corey expresses her concerns about Michael's change in behavior since they used to have a close sibling relationship, which he angrily denies, causing him to storm out of the house. The cartoon characters set off to take action regarding Michael's addiction, leaving Pooh behind to look after Corey.

At an arcade, Michael smokes marijuana with his friends and "Smoke", a villainous anthropomorphic cloud of smoke personifying temptation, who tries to convince him to take harder drugs. They are chased into an alley by Bugs Bunny disguised as a police officer. He traps Smoke in a garbage can and takes Michael back in time using a time machine borrowed from the absent Wile E. Coyote. It is shown that Michael's addiction started through peer pressure from older high school students when he was around Corey's age. Back in the present, Michael is hesitant to smoke crack with his friends before one of them steals his wallet. He and Smoke give chase and fall into a sewer, where Ninja Turtle Michelangelo tells them that the drugs are harming his brain and cautions against listening to Smoke. Baby Kermit, Baby Miss Piggy and Baby Gonzo take him on a roller coaster-esque tour of the human brain. Michael finds himself at a park, where Huey, Dewey, and Louie as well as Tigger join the rest of the cartoon characters to sing about how to refuse drugs.

Michael wakes up in his room, believing his interactions with the cartoons to be a nightmare. Corey tries talking to him, but he snaps and shoves her against his bedroom wall, frightening her. Smoke approves of the regretful Michael's actions. Michael then looks at himself in a small mirror, and Alf pulls him into a hall of mirrors, where he shows Michael his current reflection, then an aged, sickly version of himself severely affected by drugs. When Michael insists that he can easily quit and is in control of his actions, Alf reveals that Smoke is actually in charge. Back in Michael's room, Smoke traps Pooh in a cabinet to keep him out of the way and tempts Corey to try Michael's marijuana for herself. She considers that it could mend her relationship with Michael.

The carnival in Michael's mind leads him to Daffy Duck, who reads his future in a crystal ball and sees an almost skeletal Michael on his deathbed. After one last warning from the cartoons to stop taking drugs, an ashamed Michael stops Corey from using the drugs just in time. When he apologizes and expresses concern over whether he can change, she advises him to seek help from their family. Smoke tries to persuade him otherwise, but Michael throws him out a window into a garbage truck, deciding to no longer listen to him. Refusing to be defeated that easily, Smoke vows to return and get revenge. All the cartoon characters appear on a poster on Michael's wall, and they agree to be prepared for if and when Smoke returns. Michael releases Pooh from the cabinet, who jumps into the poster with the others before the siblings go downstairs to talk to their parents.

== Characters ==
The characters, from 10 different franchises, are (in order of appearance, home network in parentheses):

- The Smurfs (NBC): Papa Smurf, Brainy Smurf, Hefty Smurf and some other unidentified Smurfs (although Smurfette is seen on the poster and VHS cover, she is not seen in the special; Harmony Smurf and Baby Smurf make picture cameos)
- ALF: The Animated Series and Alf Tales (NBC): ALF
- Garfield and Friends (CBS): Garfield
- Alvin and the Chipmunks (NBC): Alvin, Simon and Theodore Seville
- The New Adventures of Winnie the Pooh (ABC): Winnie the Pooh and Tigger
- Muppet Babies (CBS): Baby Kermit, Baby Miss Piggy and Baby Gonzo
- The Real Ghostbusters (ABC/Syndication): Slimer
- Looney Tunes (ABC): Bugs Bunny and Daffy Duck (Sylvester the Cat and Road Runner make cameos in a poster in Michael's bedroom; Wile E. Coyote is mentioned but not seen; his time machine is used by Bugs Bunny)
- Teenage Mutant Ninja Turtles (CBS/Syndication): Michelangelo (although he appears in the special, he is not shown on the poster and VHS cover)
- DuckTales (Syndication): Huey, Dewey and Louie

== Voice cast ==
The various character owners licensed them freely due to the public service aspect of the special.

The special marked the first time the characters Bugs Bunny and Daffy Duck were voiced by someone other than Mel Blanc, who had died shortly before the production, prompting Warner Bros. to enlist Jeff Bergman in his place.

- Ross Bagdasarian Jr. as Alvin and Simon Seville
- Jeff Bergman as Bugs Bunny and Daffy Duck
- Townsend Coleman as Dad and Michelangelo
- Wayne Collins as Kid
- Jim Cummings as Winnie the Pooh and Tigger
- Joey Dedio as The Dealer
- Paul Fusco as ALF
- Danny Goldman as Brainy Smurf
- Georgi Irene as Kid
- Janice Karman as Theodore Seville
- Aaron Lohr as Kid
- Jason Marsden as Michael
- Don Messick as Papa Smurf
- Lorenzo Music as Garfield
- Laurie O'Brien as Mom and Baby Piggy
- Lindsay Parker as Corey
- George C. Scott as Smoke
- Russi Taylor as Baby Gonzo, Huey, Dewey, and Louie
- Frank Welker as Slimer, Hefty Smurf, and Baby Kermit

== Broadcast ==
ABC George H. W. and Barbara Bush anti-drug message promo

7 Network Bob and Hazel Hawke anti-drug message promo

The special was screened in Australia on November 9, 1990. Like the U.S. broadcast, it aired at 4.30 p.m. simultaneously on Australia's major commercial networks (Seven Network, Nine Network, and Network Ten). Prime Minister Bob Hawke introduced the Australian screening. It was screened in New Zealand in December on both TV One and Channel 2 simultaneously. Prime Minister Jim Bolger introduced it instead of the U.S. president. It was screened in Canada on the CBC, CTV, Global and most English and French independent stations, as well as YTV shortly after its original U.S. broadcast, although all of the characters had their respective shows aired on either CTV or Global but not CBC. Canadian prime minister Brian Mulroney introduced it. The special was broadcast in Mexico as offered by major outlet Televisa on both major and independent stations (including Las Estrellas and Canal 5), on the same day as the original U.S. and Canada broadcast. The special later aired in Japan by TV Tokyo with Emperor Akihito introducing it. It was also broadcast in Brazil in 1994, as Rede Manchete made Portuguese Brazilian dubbing in Herbert Richers Dubbing Studios, and in Chile by major networks organized by the National Television Council the following year in September 1995. Chile's broadcast was introduced by Eduardo Frei Ruiz-Tagle's First Lady Marta Larraechea Bolívar.

In the United States, all superstations and a handful of independent stations (mainly in selected cities) aired the special, but some stations aired the special at a different period during the week the special aired on the Big Four stations and a number of cable networks. Superstations WPIX in New York City, WGN-TV in Chicago, KTLA in Los Angeles, KTVT in Dallas, WOIO-TV in Cleveland, WKBD-TV in Detroit, KHTV in Houston, WVTV in Milwaukee, KSTW in Tacoma/Seattle, KSHB-TV in Kansas City, and KWGN in Denver premiered the special at the same time the big four networks and cable systems premiered, with St. Louis' KPLR-TV premiered the special two hours later after its television premiere. New York's WWOR-TV and Boston's WSBK-TV would later premiere the special the following morning on April 22. The special also aired on selected cable systems, including BET, TNT, USA Network, Nickelodeon, and The Disney Channel.

== Reception and legacy ==
Some modern critics have considered the production a time capsule of animation history during the US war on drugs, and have ridiculed it as "propaganda" and "preachy".

The Smurfs creator Peyo was upset with Hanna-Barbera's usage of his characters in the special without his permission, and refused any further collaborations with them. In 2015, Jim Cummings told Justin Caffier of Vice that he enjoyed the recording sessions, but requested Winnie the Pooh's lines in which he talked about drugs to be rewritten, stating, "He's an innocent. It makes no sense for him to even know those words."

Cinema Crazed also suggested that the film's staff and those who promoted the special like school teachers were also caught off guard by the rising influence of more mischievous cartoon character Bart Simpson- who was not among the cartoon characters featured in Cartoon All-Stars to the Rescue- among America's youth around the time it aired. As Cinema Crazed commentator Felix Vasquez noted "“Cartoon All Stars to the Rescue” is a weird and over the top bit of PSA against the use of recreational drugs, and features a ton of popular cartoon characters, all of whom were able to be trademarked, mind you. So there's Michelangelo from TMNT, but none of the other characters. There's Slimer, but none of the Ghostbusters. There's Garfield, but no Odie. The power of McDonald's grasp can only extend so far. Really, if we wanted to talk about popular cartoon characters, they should have had Bart Simpson join the team, but back then my teachers were warning that he was a bad influence. Yes, folks, back in 1990, Bart Simpson was going to corrupt our innocence. In either case, “Cartoon All Stars to the Rescue” is a cavalcade of pop culture characters and popular cartoons, all of whom were on television during the beginning of the decade." By May 1990, Bart would even be publicly criticized by Office of National Drug Control Policy head William Bennett, who was at the time considered to be the American "drug czar," as a bad influence in the effort to reach out to children about the dangers of drug abuse.

== See also ==
- Who Framed Roger Rabbit
- Reefer Madness
