= Michu Meszaros =

Hungarian actor (1939–2016)

Mihaly "Michu" Meszaros
- Born: Mészáros Mihály; 1 October 1939; Budapest, Hungary
- Died: 12 June 2016 (aged 76); Los Angeles, California, U.S.
- Occupations: Actor; circus performer; entertainer; stuntman
- Years active: 1969–1993, 2015
- Height: 84 cm (2 ft 9 in)

Mihaly "Michu" Meszaros (Hungarian: Mészáros Mihály, Hungarian pronunciation: [ˈmeːsaːroʃ ˈmihaːj]; 1 October 1939 – 12 June 2016) was a Hungarian and American actor, circus performer/entertainer, and stuntman. He was 2 feet 9 inches (0.84 m) tall and weighed 25 pounds. He was best remembered as a performer with Ringling Bros. and Barnum & Bailey Circus and for his role in the NBC sitcom ALF in 1986. He appeared in many films in the late 1980s and early 1990s and also appeared opposite Michael Jackson in a Pepsi commercial and in the Ozzy Osbourne music video for "Time After Time" in 1992. His last appearance was in Death to Cupid (2015).

== Biography ==
=== Early life ===
Meszaros was born in a small village outside Budapest and was the seventh of nine siblings. He attended a school of circus arts and performed in the circus since age nine, working two or three shows a day, five days a week. He performed in the Liebel Family Circus and toured Eastern Europe. However, a government agent from the Hungarian People's Republic followed him to make sure he did not defect, and the government took most of his money.

=== Career ===
Circus producers Irvin Feld and Kenneth Feld had heard of Meszaros, and, after locating him in 1973, signed him to a contract and made arrangements to bring him to the U.S. and have him star in the Ringling Bros. and Barnum & Bailey Circus as the "smallest man in the world".

In 1980, Meszaros, along with his Hungarian guard, defected to the U.S. He became a resident alien in 1984.

As a circus performer, he performed an act with poodles, in which the poodles, standing on their hind legs, appeared much taller than Meszaros, delighting children in the crowd.

In the Grand Spectacle performance of 1982 and 1983, Meszaros portrayed a character known as the Marshal of Marshmallow Gulch, resplendent in a well-tailored white, silver and gold costume encrusted with rhinestones, along with a ten-gallon cowboy hat and silver cowboy boots.

In the 1980s, Hawthorne, California, where he resided, named the shortest street in that city "Michu Lane" in his honor.

For the first season of the ALF television series, in 1986, Meszaros donned a costume whenever a full-body shot was needed for scenes of the alien walking, running, or standing. However, in most cases, upper-body shots of a mechanical puppet were used instead as the costume was uncomfortable. Meszaros had no lines in the show and was let go after two years.

Meszaros became a U.S. citizen in 1990.

== Death ==
Meszaros died in June 2016 at Providence Little Company of Mary Medical Center in Torrance, California, after a stroke at his home that left him in a coma for several days. He had overcome another stroke eight years earlier and was dealing with several health issues.

In October 2018, his memorial service was held at the Dearly Departed Tours & Artifact Museum, owned and operated by author and historian Scott Michaels. Meszaros’ remains had been inurned and on public display along with items from his life and career until the museum closed in 2021. In September 2023, a crowdfunding campaign was launched by Michaels and "Dearly Departed", in order to raise funds for a formal, more appropriate interment. This was successful, and Meszaros was ultimately interred at Valhalla Memorial Park in April 2024.

== Filmography ==
Year	Title	Role	Notes
1986	ALF	ALF	credited as one of Alf's "Assistants"
1988	Waxwork	Hans	
1988	Big Top Pee-wee	Andy	
1989	Look Who's Talking	"baby stunt performer"	
1991	Dear John	Mishka	Episode: "Louise, the Hero"
1993	Freaked	George Ramirez #3	
1993	Warlock: The Armageddon	Augusto	
2015	Death to Cupid	Leprechaun	Short film
