= ALF: The Animated Series =

American animated television series

- Created by: Paul Fusco; Tom Patchett
- Based on: ALF by: Paul Fusco; Tom Patchett
- Directed by: Richard Raynis (season 1); Dan Riba (season 2)
- Voices of: Paul Fusco; Peggy Mahon; Tabitha St. Germain (as Paulina Gillis); Thick Wilson; Dan Hennessey; Rob Cowan
- Country of origin: United States
- Original language: English
- No. of seasons: 2
- No. of episodes: 26

Production
- Running time: 30 minutes
- Production companies: DIC Animation City; Saban Productions; Alien Productions

Original release
- Network: NBC
- Release: September 26, 1987 – January 7, 1989

ALF: The Animated Series (also known as ALF on Melmac) is an American animated television series that aired on NBC for 26 episodes from September 26, 1987, to January 7, 1989.

ALF: The Animated Series was a prequel and animated spinoff of the prime time series ALF, which also aired on NBC from 1986 to 1990. Paul Fusco, the creator and puppeteer of ALF in the live-action series, was the only cast member to reprise his role; none of the human characters from the prime time ALF appeared in the animated series, due to its nature as a prequel and its setting being on Melmac rather than Earth. ALF Tales was a spin-off of the series, which also aired on NBC on Saturdays from September 1988 to December 1989. The two ALF animated series ran concurrently during the 1988–89 season as the ALF & ALF Tales Hour.

== Synopsis ==
=== Setting ===
The series is a prequel to ALF, depicting ALF's life on his home planet of Melmac before it exploded and he came to Earth. Since the name ALF was given to him after his arrival on Earth, he is instead known by his original name, Gordon Shumway. The puppet ALF appears at the beginning and end of the episode, talking to the viewers in the Tanner family's garage and either setting up the episode as if he were writing his memoir "Melmac Memories" and commenting on it afterwards, reading fan mail, or describing what his life was like on Melmac. The visual look of the series was created by lead character designer Fil Barlow.

The format of the series is that of a situation comedy, with much of the humor deriving from the characters partaking in ordinary activities, but in an alien environment.

Gordon/ALF as depicted in the series is later one of the cartoon characters featured in Cartoon All-Stars to the Rescue.

=== Plot ===
Gordon Shumway is a teenager who lives in suburban East Velcro on the planet Melmac with his parents Bob and Flo, his brother Curtis, his younger sister Augie, and their dog Neep. He has two friends, Rick and Skip, and a girlfriend, Rhonda, who, along with him, are members of the Melmacian Orbit Guard. The show also features supporting characters, such as the fortune teller Madame Pokipsi and the villainous Larson Petty and his sidekick Eggbert.

== Characters ==
=== The Shumway Family ===
- Gordon (Gordo) Shumway / ALF (voiced by Paul Fusco) – The protagonist. A resident of East Velcro and member of the Melmacian Orbit Guard.
- Bob Shumway (voiced by Thick Wilson) – Gordon's father. He works at a mayonnaise factory and is an amateur inventor.
- Flo Shumway (voiced by Peggy Mahon) – Gordon's mother.
- Curtis Shumway (voiced by Michael Fantini) – Gordon's younger brother.
- Augie Shumway (voiced by Paulina Gillis) – Gordon's younger sister.
- Neep – The Shumway family's pet, a dog-like alien creature called a vespa.
- Harry – The Shumway family's pet, a bird-like alien creature called a Westfellman Smulk.

=== Melmacians ===
- Rhonda (voiced by Paulina Gillis) – Gordon's girlfriend who is secretly an accomplished pilot.
- Skipper "Skip" (voiced by Rob Cowan) – One of Gordon's friends
- Rick Fusterman (voiced by Paul Fusco) – One of Gordon's friends.
- Spudder – Curtis' friend.
- Stella (voiced by Ellen-Ray Hennessy) – A waitress at the Cats Up Diner.
- Eddie – The owner of the Cats Up Diner.
- Madame Pokipsi (voiced by Deborah Theaker) – A fortune teller.
- Colonel Cantfayl (voiced by Len Carlson) – A colonel in the Orbit Guard and Sargent Staff's superior.
- Sargent Staff (voiced by Len Carlson) – A sergeant in the Orbit Guard and Gordon, Skip and Rick's superior officer, whom Gordon is often at odds at.
- Freda Fusterman (voiced by Marla Lukofsky)
- Tillie (voiced by Marla Lukofsky)
- Jane Appalling (voiced by Marla Lukofsky)
- TV Announcer (voiced by Marla Lukofsky)

=== Villains ===
- Larson Petty (voiced by Thick Wilson) – The main antagonist of the series. He is an unspecified alien general who attempts to invade Melmac.
  - Sloop (voiced by Dan Hennessey) - The son/aide of Larson Petty. His birth name is Eggbert Petty.
- Louie the Pruner - A villain and owner of a salad dressing empire.
  - Sonny - The son of Louie the Pruner.

== Episodes ==
Each episode is bookended by ALF in live-action talking about his upcoming book Melmac Memories about his life on Melmac during his first year in the Orbit Guard.

=== Season 1 (1987–88) ===
No. overall	No. in season	Title	Written by	Original release date
1	1	"Phantom Pilot"	Michael Maurer	September 26, 1987
During their initial year of training in the Orbit Guard, Gordon and his companions encounter a crisis when Melmac is targeted by Larson Petty. Due to an error, Colonel Cantfayl inadvertently assigns Gordon as his co-pilot, resulting in peril due to Gordon's lack of skill. Rhonda, operating as the Phantom Pilot, intervenes to assist. Larson Petty initiates another attack, deploying adhesive-filled bags. Despite Gordon's accidental ejection of Rhonda, he devises a successful strategy to ensnare Petty's fighter using a large rooftop donut sign.
2	2	"Hair Today, Bald Tomorrow"	Duane Capizzi & Richard Raynis	October 3, 1987
While Gordon slumbers, Harry plucks his hair to furnish its nest. Upon awakening, Gordon believes he has become bald and seeks a remedy from Madame Pokipsi. Following an altercation where Gordon disparages her skills, Pokipsi retaliates by casting a "Baldness Touch" curse upon him that causes anyone he touches to become bald. To break the curse, Gordon must embark on a quest to acquire a rare golden egg. In a misguided attempt, he steals Pokipsi's crystal ball but struggles to control its power. Eventually, Harry lays a golden egg, which Gordon presents to Pokipsi as restitution, prompting her to lift the curse.
3	3	"Two for the Brig"	Mark Jones	October 10, 1987
Gordon mistakenly installs a classified engine into Sergeant Staff's dilapidated car. The sergeant sells the car to Milo Fleece, a used car salesman, who further sells it to Eggbert, an associate of Larson Petty. Upon discovering the engine's absence, Sergeant Staff and Gordon are incarcerated. Despite being handcuffed together, they successfully escape and recover the engine, subsequently returning it to Larson Petty, who had installed it in his new tank.
4	4	"Gordon Ships Out"	Dan DiStefano	October 24, 1987
Close companions Gordon, Rick, and Skip opt to share accommodations following disputes with their parents. They secure a rental garbage scow from Solly, a real estate agent known for driving a Lamborghini Succotash. To generate funds, they organize a rent party, which proves unsuccessful, leading to interpersonal discord and endangering their camaraderie. Concurrently, Skip's pet termite, Woody, inadvertently sets the boat adrift. They narrowly escape peril when they unintentionally drift into an Orbit Guard firing range, and later encounter a sea monster attracted by Rick's "electric narf" music.
5	5	"Birdman of Melmac"	Martin Donoff	October 31, 1987
During a lecture delivered by avian expert Thor Thundersocks, the Shumway family learns that their pet bird, Harry, is in fact Westfellman Smulk, believed to be the last surviving member of an allegedly extinct species. In an effort to safeguard Harry, Thundersocks transforms the Shumway household into an ideal bird habitat, causing significant disruption to the family's living space. As Harry gains notoriety and becomes increasingly haughty, Gordon discovers a photo album depicting Harry's extensive family lineage, including numerous individuals of the supposedly extinct species.
6	6	"Pismo and the Orbit Gyro"	Duane Capizzi & Richard Raynis	November 7, 1987
Gordon and Rick, accompanied by Rhonda, embark on their routine maintenance journey to the planetary core to service the Orbit Gyro. During maintenance, Gordon damages Pismo, the Gyro's controlling robot. Despite Gordon's repair attempts, a missing screw causes Pismo to malfunction. Leaving Rick in charge, they return to the surface with Pismo, but the robot's erratic behavior causes widespread traffic disruptions.
7	7	"20,000 Years in Driving School"	Dan DiStefano	November 14, 1987
Following an incident of "Gooping" for speeding on the highway, Gordon faces the revocation of his driver's license and is subsequently sent to Allen Wood Reformatory. During his time there, Gordon undergoes a driving test, inadvertently offending Mr. Bloatman, also known as the "Fat Man" who oversees the examination. Despite challenges, Gordon emerges victorious in the test, uncovering Bloatman's cheating tactics, leading to his disqualification. In response, Bloatman resorts to hostage-taking, targeting the warden.
8	8	"Pride of the Shumways"	Howard Bendetson & Terrie Collins	November 21, 1987
Gordon participates in Bouillabaseball for the Orbit Guard and catches the attention of talent scout Max Dirtsky from the Codsters. Despite Gordon's initial struggles as a player, Dirtsky offers him a professional contract. However, the Codsters begin to suffer losses due to Gordon's poor performance. Simultaneously, Curtis, a skilled little league player, overhears the team's owner placing bets against their success. In a bid to turn the game around, Gordon strategically substitutes his pet fish Bismark for the standard fish, confounding the opposing team and enabling him to score multiple home runs. Nevertheless, just as victory seems within reach, Gordon is incapacitated by a fish loaded with lead weights.
9	9	"Captain Bobaroo"	Martin Donoff	December 5, 1987
Following a mishap with one of his inventions, Bob Shumway adopts the persona of "Captain Bobaroo," (a parody of Captain Kangaroo). While his family initially follows medical advice to indulge his delusions, Bob's actions lead to chaos when he takes his show to a mayonnaise factory, resulting in his dismissal. In a bid to address the situation, Gordon, along with Skip and Rick, pose as television executives. They inform Bob that his show, Captain Bobaroo, has been canceled but offer him the lead role in a new family sitcom titled Meet the Shumways.
10	10	"Neep at the Races"	Steve Hayes	December 12, 1987
Gordon discovers his dog Neep's exceptional speed when chasing vehicle hood ornaments, prompting him to enter Neep in the South Toaster Sweepstakes in Appliance. Gordon sells shares to Snake, the biker gang leader, to fund Neep's training. Despite setbacks like Neep's overindulgence, they win the race with Gordon's help. However, the bikers' motorcycles are damaged, leading to conflict as Snake seeks prize money for repairs, forcing Gordon and his friends to flee Appliance.
11	11	"Salad Wars"	Dan DiStefano	December 19, 1987
Gordon's family embarks on a wagon train holiday in their mobile motorhome but diverges to explore Salad Dressing Town's theme park. Concurrently, the park's proprietor, Louie the Pruner, seeks rare plastic pussy willow seeds from farmer Albert. Albert seeks refuge aboard the Shumway's vehicle as Louie pursues them in a flower-picking machine. Gordon and Albert get captured. In the hideout both suffer a foot-tickle torture and the villains even want lick salad dressing off Gordon's feet to get the informations they need. But Gordon and Albert escape. Leveraging the annual eruption of Mount Snout. This act ensures widespread dispersal of Albert's seeds, despite the challenges encountered during their ordeal.
12	12	"Tough Shrimp Don't Dance"	Duane Capizzi & Richard Raynis	January 2, 1988
While engaged in litter eradication efforts on Melmac using an ionizer ray from an orbiting spacecraft, Gordon and Rick encounter hostile encounters with the diminutive alien species known as the Muklukians. One Muklukian covertly accompanies Gordon back to Melmac, assuming his identity through an inflatable replica. Despite this ruse, Gordon successfully apprehends the imposter. Simultaneously, Larson Petty endeavors to conquer Melmac by submerging it under a mountain of refuse. Petty seizes Rick and the Muklukians, but Gordon, aided by the Muklukian ally, orchestrates their liberation.
13	13	"Home Away from Home"	Duane Capizzi & Richard Raynis	January 16, 1988
Gordon's parents leave for a vacation, leaving him in charge of the household. Chaos ensues, leading to the collapse of the house. Unable to pay for repairs, engineers claim the house. It is then sold to Harold Williams, who takes it to the Polyester Islands. Gordon, with Rick, Curtis, and Augie, travels to the islands to retrieve the house. Using a hijacked blimp, Gordon successfully brings the house back just before his parents return.

=== Season 2 (1988–89) ===
No. overall	No. in season	Title	Written by	Original release date
14	1	"Flodust Memories"	Alicia Marie Schudt	September 10, 1988
The Shumaways nominate Flo for the Mom of the Millennium contest, realizing their prior oversight of her importance. After winning, Flo is signed by the dubious agent Sidley Slick, who sends her on a year-long tour of Melmac. As months pass, the family keenly feels Flo's absence, prompting them to urge her to end the tour and return home.
15	2	"Family Feud"	Martin Donoff	September 17, 1988
Following their defeat to the Shumways on the Wheel of Cheese game show, the Fustermans initiate hostilities against their erstwhile friends. Gordon and Rick find themselves ensnared in the ensuing conflict and devise a strategy to facilitate reconciliation between the two families.
16	3	"Clams Never Sang for My Father"	Duane Capizzi	September 24, 1988
In the traditional Mayonnaise Lodge rite of passage, Bob Shumway and Frank Fusterman aim for their sons' success in the clam-wrestling contest. Although the boys lack interest, they join to fulfill their fathers' expectations. Rick's spontaneous success in making the clam sing reveals that his father had falsified his own victory photograph.
17	4	"A Mid-Goomer Night's Dream"	Alicia Marie Schudt	October 1, 1988
As Goomer Day nears on Melmac, Larson Petty mistakenly captures Bob Shumway, disguised as Goomer. Gordon and Augie set out to find the real Goomer to enlist his help in rescuing their father.
18	5	"The Bone Losers"	Mark C. Miller	October 8, 1988
The populace of Melmac, including Rhonda, is enthralled by Professor Egovurger's discovery of the Thesaurus skeleton. Meanwhile, Gordon uncovers dinosaur remains in his yard and invents a creature named "Tunadacyl." Unaware that Neep stole the bones from the museum, Gordon attempts to return them. Simultaneously, Egovurger plots to steal the bones, but his scheme is foiled, leading to his arrest for fraud.
19	6	"Thank Gordon for Little Girls"	Alicia Marie Schudt	October 15, 1988
Gordon creates the "Shumwidget" from a discarded piece of wood and struggles to find its purpose. With Augie's help, they secure a large order from a department store. However, their production line turns into a sweatshop. Augie leads her troupe of Dust Bunnies on strike and takes over the company. When faulty widgets cause customer complaints, Gordon and Augie must collaborate on a solution.
20	7	"Hooray for Mellywood"	Martin Donoff	October 29, 1988
Gordon's screenplay is acquired by Herschel Orsen Mucus, a key figure in Mellywood. However, Mucus transforms the script into the latest Gutsquisher installment, starring Ron Fishbait. Displeased with the changes, Gordon schemes to destroy the film production.
21	8	"The Spy from East Velcro"	Duane Capizzi & Steve Roberts	November 12, 1988
Gordon inadvertently adopts the persona of the esteemed agent James Bonzo after discovering a rare winning trading card and Bonzo's distinctive shoe phone. This leads him into the clutches of the eccentric Ernst Stavro Blofish, who seeks to secure the winning cereal card for victory in the Spy Land competition. With the assistance of Curtis and their spy-oriented comrades, Gordon foils Blofish's scheme.
22	9	"He Ain't Seafood, He's My Brother"	Alicia Marie Schudt	November 19, 1988
The Muklukian renegades execute the abduction of Curtis Shumway, orchestrating his transport to their planetary domain with the intention of facilitating their ascension to the throne of Mukluk. Subsequently, Fescue, a representative of the Muklukian faction, appeals to Gordon for assistance in dethroning the renegades and reinstating the rightful monarch of Mukluk.
23	10	"Looking for Love in All the Wrong Places"	Bradley Kesden & Skip Shepard	December 3, 1988
Gordon's attempt to find a date for his friend Rick at the Orbit Guard Ball backfires when Eddie's cousin Elaine develops feelings for Gordon instead. Gordon devises a complex plan to rectify the misunderstanding, while Elaine and Rick discover common interests, leading to a connection between them.
24	11	"The Slugs of Wrath"	Martin Donoff	December 10, 1988
Following the closure of the mayonnaise factory, Bob Shumway loses his job, prompting the family's move to an abandoned farm. They aim to cultivate giant slugs and hay-wire as a secondary crop. However, their presence triggers suspicion and superstition among the locals, leading to a plan to sacrifice Bob and Flo to remedy their ailing slugs. Gordon's intervention, through the discovery of a subterranean reserve of authentic mayonnaise, resolves the crisis and restores the family's reputation.
25	12	"Housesitting for Pokipsi"	Duane Capizzi & Steve Roberts	December 17, 1988
Gordon, Rick, and Skip agree to house-sit for Madame Pokipsi while she attends a conference out of town, during which she transforms Rick into a sandwich. In a bid to reverse the transformation, Gordon uses Madame Pokipsi's malfunctioning crystal ball against her advice, triggering a series of chaotic events in the household.
26	13	"Skipper's Got a Brand New Dad"	Duane Capizzi	January 7, 1989
Gordon and Rick, upon discovering Skip's orphaned history, initiate a search for his biological father. Simultaneously, Larson Petty's uncle's demise uncovers an inheritance intended for his estranged son, Eggbert. Petty contends that Skip is the rightful heir, yet Skip prioritizes paternal bonds over financial gain. Subsequent inquiries by Gordon reveal Sloop as Petty's true offspring. However, Petty's newfound wealth quickly dissipates due to medical costs stemming from a hang-gliding accident.

== Home media ==
On May 30, 2006, Lionsgate Home Entertainment released both the first nine episodes of ALF: The Animated Series as ALF Animated Adventures – 20,000 Years in Driving School and Other Stories; and the first seven episodes of ALF Tales entitled ALF and The Beanstalk and Other Classic Fairy Tales on DVD in Region 1.

Some episodes can also be found in the special features section of the collectors edition release of the original live action series.

The complete series was remastered and subsequently released on October 17, 2023, by Shout! Factory in the DVD box set ALF: The Complete Series (Deluxe Edition). The box set release also included the original 1986–90 sitcom, ALF Tales and Project: ALF.

== See also ==
- List of animated spinoffs from prime time shows

== Notes ==
- Animation outsourced from TMS Entertainment
