= Space Cats =

- Genre: Adventure; Science fiction Comedy
- Created by: Paul Fusco
- Developed by: Rowby Goren
- Starring: Paul Fusco; Charles Nelson Reilly
- Voices of: Rob Paulsen; Townsend Coleman; Pat Fraley
- Narrated by: Robert Ridgely
- Theme music composer: Leslie Ann Podkin; Alf Clausen
- Composers: Shuki Levy; Udi Harpaz
- Country of origin: United States
- Original language: English
- No. of seasons: 1
- No. of episodes: 13

Production
- Executive producers: Paul Fusco; Bernie Brillstein; Joe Taritero
- Producer: Leslie Ann Podkin
- Production companies: Marvel Productions; Paul Fusco Productions

Original release
- Network: NBC
- Release: September 14 – December 14, 1991

Space Cats is a 1991 American animated comedy television series (with some live-action puppetry sequences) created by Paul Fusco, that aired on Saturday mornings on NBC from September 14 to December 14, 1991. It depicts alien felines helping mankind.

Charles Nelson Reilly made brief but memorable appearances in each episode as D.O.R.C.

== Plot ==
The Space Cats come from a planet called Trygliceride-7, ruled by a being named D.O.R.C. (short for Disembodied Omnipotent Ruler of Cats) which can be described as a disembodied, bespectacled, human head with a funny voice and green skin. The Space Cats station themselves on Earth in an underground base with a garbage can as its only access. A live-action segment is shown, where various Space Cats are seen on duty.

D.O.R.C. describes each mission to the team's leader Captain Catgut. The animated segment is then shown where Captain Catgut sends the team of Tom, Scratch and Sniff out to work. At the end of each episode, the group gives the viewers a moral, then wrap up the episode vocalizing the Charge music and shouting out their team name. This was spoofed, when one Space Cat says the moral is for kids to stop watching TV and go read a book, the other two angrily remark that if that is taken seriously it would result in their own cancellation, in which it did end after July 1992 as these results were disputed by Federal Communications Commission.

== Episodes ==
| No. | Title | Written by | Original release date |
|---|---|---|---|
| 1 | "Send in the Clones" | Howard Bendetson; Paul Fusco; David Silverman | September 14, 1991 |
The Spacecats are sent to investigate why a clown who runs a respected children's show has now been promoting violence and crime. The Spacecats find the real TV host who has been kidnapped and replaced with a robotic doppelganger. A sleazy show business executive now controls programming through these robot clones, and the second plan of his stage is to do this with the President of the United States. Unfortunately for the Spacecats, the bad guy has captured them and replaced them with robots, who commit crimes and ruin the reputation of the Space Cats. Trivia: The Space Cats find among the hostages Spider-Man which was a likely reference to Marvel Productions which produced the show, ALF referring to Paul Fusco who worked on both shows and voiced Captain Catgut, and George H. W. Bush, who was in office at the time of the episode's debut.
| 2 | "Stinking Pollution" | David Silverman; Rogena Schuyler | September 21, 1991 |
Mass pollution and toxic waste has been infecting communities. The Spacecats look to root of the matter whilst being stalked by a "shadowy figure".
| 3 | "Like Cats to Water" | Terrie Collins | September 28, 1991 |
Earth's water supply is drying up at a rapid pace. The Space Cats are at a loss to explain, until they find a water park has been doing a roaring business.
| 4 | "Thank You, Masked Man" | David Silverman; Rogena Schuyler | October 5, 1991 |
An old superhero is now a has-been forgotten by the general public. A Hollywood producer says he can revive the over-the-hill superhero's career, but it is a conspiracy to dupe him into committing crimes. The Spacecats try and get him to return to his glory days.
| 5 | "A Recession is Depressin'" | Rowby Goren | October 12, 1991 |
The U.S. Treasury is empty, sending the country into grinding poverty. When a lack of physical robbery is found, it is shown to be the work of a crooked government employee, who beats the Space Cats to the punch through computer crime, digitally sending the stolen cash into random bank accounts across America.
| 6 | "Diamonds are Fur-ever" | George Atkins | October 19, 1991 |
A famous professor has been kidnapped in the Amazon, and the Space Cats’ assignment is to rescue Him.
| 7 | "Mirror, Mirror, on the Wall" | Ted Pederson | October 26, 1991 |
Beautiful women are turning into ugly hags without explanation. Captain Catgut assigns an extra member to the team, a female Space Cat named Yvette Meow. The cats link the ugliness to a hairdresser who wishes to be the only beautiful woman in the world, and suspect the movie star Lollipop is the next target.
| 8 | "The Incredible Shrinking Monuments" | George Atkins | November 2, 1991 |
Earth's famed landmarks have vanished, and the trail leads to a mini-golf course.
| 9 | "Blintzcapades" | George Atkins | November 9, 1991 |
| 10 | "A Tale of Two Kitties" | Unknown | November 23, 1991 |
| 11 | "Mysteriously Missing Guests" | George Atkins | November 30, 1991 |
The Space Cats head to Tonsil Manor to locate the guests who are mysteriously vanishing.
| 12 | "Operation Pine Crud" | Judy Rothman | December 7, 1991 |
The Spacecats are sent to the Yellowbelly Nat'l Park (A parody of the Yellowstone Nat'l Park) investigate deforestation. They link it to an air freshener company owned by Chuck von Crud.
| 13 | "Y.I. Auto" | Unknown | December 14, 1991 |

== Cast ==
=== Principal voice actors ===
- Townsend Coleman as Scratch
- Pat Fraley as Sniff
- Rob Paulsen as Thomas 'Tom' Spacecat, Chelsie Pipshire
- Robert Ridgely as Narrator

=== Live-action segment ===
- Paul Fusco - Captain Catgut (puppeteer and voice)
- Charles Nelson Reilly - D.O.R.C.
- Lisa Buckley, Bob Fappiano, Allan Trautman, Phil Baron, Blake Buckley - additional Space Cats

=== Additional voices ===
- Jack Angel -
- Gregg Berger -
- Sheryl Bernstein -
- Susan Blu -
- Hamilton Camp -
- Cam Clarke -
- Jennifer Darling -
- Walker Edmiston -
- Jeannie Elias -
- John Erwin -
- Lea Floden -
- Paul Fusco - Swifty Sleazoid (in "Send in the Clones")
- Brad Garrett -
- Barry Gordon -
- Pat Musick - Dementia DeFortino (in "Mirror, Mirror on the Wall")
- Jan Rabson -
- Hal Rayle -
- Maggie Roswell -
- Susan Silo -
- Kath Soucie - Yvette Meow, Lollipop (in "Mirror, Mirror on the Wall")
- John Stephenson -
- Lennie Weinrib -

== Crew ==
- Susan Blu - Animation Dialogue Director
- Jamie Simone - Dialogue Editor
- Shuki Levy - Original Music
