= ALF season 4 =

ALF
- Season 4
- DVD cover
- No. of episodes: 24

Release
- Original network: NBC
- Original release: September 18, 1989 – March 24, 1990

Season chronology
- ← Previous; Season 3

This is a list of episodes from the fourth and final season of ALF. Most episode titles are named after popular songs.

== Broadcast history ==
The season aired Mondays at 8:00-8:30 pm (EST) on NBC until March 1990. The final three episodes aired on Saturdays at 8:00-8:30 pm (EST). Reruns would air temporarily on Sundays at 8:30-9:00 pm (EST) during the follow-up to the spring lineup, but it would return to the series' traditional slot for the final airings on NBC.

== DVD release ==
The season was released on DVD by Lionsgate Home Entertainment.

== Cast ==
- Paul Fusco as ALF (puppeteer, voice)
  - Lisa Buckley as ALF (assistant puppeteer)
  - Bob Fappiano as ALF (assistant puppeteer)
- Max Wright as Willie Tanner
- Anne Schedeen as Kate Tanner
- Andrea Elson as Lynn Tanner
- Benji Gregory as Brian Tanner
- Charles Nickerson as Eric Tanner
- Jim J. Bullock as Neal Tanner

== Episodes ==
No. overall	No. in season	Title	Directed by	Written by	Original release date	Prod. code	U.S. viewers (millions)
74	1	"Baby, Come Back"	Paul Miller	David Silverman & Stephen Sustarsic	September 18, 1989	4002	22.5
ALF earns the right to babysit Eric. The episode title is based on the Player song.
75	2	"Lies"	Paul Miller	Jordan Tabat & Wesley Stern	September 25, 1989	4003	22.4
ALF is accidentally photographed by a tabloid photographer. ALF sneaks into their van to eat the film while Willie uses his memory of Star Trek episodes to make up extraterrestrial stories, whose credulity actually amazes the paparazzi. The episode title is based on any of a large number of songs (including ones by The Knickerbockers, The Rolling Stones, and Thompson Twins).
76	3	"Wanted: Dead or Alive"	Nick Havinga	Victor Fresco	October 2, 1989	4004	22.3
ALF is worried about Willie when a criminal resembling him is profiled on a crime-stopper TV show. Guest stars: David Alan Grier as FBI #1, John Ingle (uncredited) The episode title is based on the Bon Jovi song.
77	4	"We're in the Money"	Paul Miller	Jeanne Baruch & Jeanne Romano	October 9, 1989	4001	22.7
Using Willie's home computer, ALF discovers and becomes addicted to making stock-market deals. The episode title is based on the song written for the film Gold Diggers of 1933.
78	5	"Mind Games"	Nick Havinga	Jerry Stahl	October 16, 1989	3024	23.4
After another visit from Larry, ALF subjects the Tanners to a barrage of unwanted psychoanalysis. Note: This episode was originally produced for Season 3, but aired during Season 4. Guest stars: Bill Daily as Larry, Ian Abercrombie as British Announcer (voice) (uncredited) The episode title is based on the John Lennon song.
79	6	"Hooked on a Feeling"	Nick Havinga	Victor Fresco	October 23, 1989	4005	22.6
In an effort to curb ALF's cotton addiction, Willie holds a support group meeting in his living room. The episode title is based on the B. J. Thomas song popularized by Blue Swede.
80	7	"He Ain't Heavy, He's Willie's Brother"	Paul Fusco	Paul Fusco & Lisa A. Bannick	October 30, 1989	4006	21.4
ALF plots the removal of Willie's visiting brother Neal (Jim J. Bullock) after ALF is made not to leave his attic apartment at any time. Note: Jim J. Bullock's (Neal Tanner) first appearance on the show. John LaMotta (Trevor Ochmonek) and Liz Sheridan (Raquel Ochmonek) do not appear in this episode. The episode title is based on the song popularized by The Hollies.
81	8	"The First Time Ever I Saw Your Face"	Paul Fusco	Paul Fusco & Lisa A. Bannick	November 6, 1989	4007	23.9
ALF is peeved at having to remain hidden while Willie's brother extends his visit. Note: John LaMotta (Trevor Ochmonek) and Liz Sheridan (Raquel Ochmonek) do not appear in this episode. The episode title is based on the song popularized by Roberta Flack.
82	9	"Live and Let Die"	Tony Csiki	Steve Pepoon	November 13, 1989	4008	24.4
After Lucky dies, ALF adopts a group of kittens for a meal. However, after one kitten grows fond of ALF, he begins to question his personal view on cats. Note: Jim J. Bullock (Neal Tanner), John LaMotta (Trevor Ochmonek) and Liz Sheridan (Raquel Ochmonek) do not appear in this episode. The episode title is based on the Bond movie theme by Paul McCartney.
83	10	"Break Up to Make Up"	Tony Csiki	Anne Meara	November 20, 1989	4009	22.9
Dorothy and Whizzer get into a fight, and an angry Dorothy runs away. Whizzer meets ALF while searching for her. Guest star: Paul Dooley as Whizzer Note: John LaMotta (Trevor Ochmonek) and Liz Sheridan (Raquel Ochmonek) do not appear in this episode. The episode title is based on the Stylistics song.
84	11	"Happy Together"	Paul Fusco	David Silverman & Stephen Sustarsic	November 27, 1989	4010	22.6
Following a fight with Willie, Neal offers ALF a place to stay, but ALF's party animal ways threaten both Neal's new apartment as well as his job as the maintenance man. Guest star: Dan Gilvezan as Harry Note: John LaMotta (Trevor Ochmonek) and Liz Sheridan (Raquel Ochmonek) do not appear in this episode. The episode title is based on the Turtles song.
85	12	"Fever"	Paul Miller	Bruce David	December 4, 1989	3025	22.7
The common cold infects Willie, as well as ALF. However, when ALF does not show signs of recovery, the Tanners are concerned it may end his life. Note: This episode was originally produced for Season 3, but aired during Season 4. Jim J. Bullock (Neal Tanner) does not appear in this episode. The episode title is based on the Little Willie John song popularized by Peggy Lee.
86	13	"It's My Party"	Nick Havinga	Steve Pepoon	December 11, 1989	4012	23.2
ALF is relegated to the attic when the Tanners throw a luau, the first party they have hosted since ALF's arrival on Earth. Guest star: Henry G. Sanders as George Note: John LaMotta's (Trevor Ochmonek) final appearance on the show. Jim J. Bullock (Neal Tanner) and Liz Sheridan (Raquel Ochmonek) do not appear in this episode. The episode title is based on the Lesley Gore song.
87	14	"Make 'Em Laugh"	Nick Havinga	Howard Bendetson	January 8, 1990	4011	23.5
ALF dreams he is a famous stand-up comic. Guest stars: Casey Kasem as Himself, David Spade as Larry Slotkin, John Pinette as Howie Anderson Note: Jim J. Bullock (Neal Tanner) does not appear in this episode. The episode title is based on the song from Singin' in the Rain.
88	15	"Love on the Rocks"	Nick Havinga	Cecile Alch & Patricia Niedzialek	January 15, 1990	4014	21.7
When Neal and his ex-wife Margaret reconcile, ALF goes a long way to prove that her motives are not sincere. Note: Jim J. Bullock's (Neal Tanner) final appearance on the show. Liz Sheridan (Raquel Ochmonek) does not appear in this episode. The episode title is based on either the song by Neil Diamond or the one by Poison.
89	16	"True Colors"	Paul Miller	David Silverman & Stephen Sustarsic	January 22, 1990	4015	18.8
ALF develops an interest in art after Lynn's professor compliments one of his paintings. The episode title is based on the Cyndi Lauper song.
90	17	"Gimme That Old Time Religion"	Paul Fusco	Leslie Ann Podkin	January 29, 1990	4016	20.9
As a newly ordained Melmacian minister, ALF officiates a ceremony on Earth. Note: Liz Sheridan's (Raquel Ochmonek) final appearance on the show. The episode title is based on the 19th-century gospel song.
91	18	"Future's So Bright, I Gotta Wear Shades"	Nick Havinga	Victor Fresco	February 5, 1990	4013	20.5
ALF considers the future with the Tanners, who will have shorter lifespans than the Melmacian alien. Guest stars: Dean Cameron as Robert Sherwood, Edward Edwards as Brian, Sr., Mark Blankfield as Eric, Sr, Fran Drescher as Roxanne The episode title is based on the Timbuk 3 song.
92	19	"When I'm 64"	Paul Miller	David Silverman & Stephen Sustarsic	February 12, 1990	4018	29.3
ALF encounters senior citizens when he sneaks into a retirement home and convinces an old lady named Louise to share her experiences with others. Guest star: Jack Armstrong as Ben Note: Lynn and Brian are both absent in this episode. The episode title is based on the Beatles song.
93	20	"Mr. Sandman"	Paul Miller	Steve Pepoon	February 19, 1990	4019	21.0
ALF and Willie scour Death Valley for buried treasure after discovering an old map. Will ALF succeed in driving Willie insane? The episode title is based on the song popularized by The Chordettes.
94	21	"Stayin' Alive"	Nick Havinga	Victor Fresco	February 26, 1990	4020	21.9
Outraged, ALF writes nasty letters to SENDRAX, a pollution-producing company. Taken with the letter-writing, SENDRAX offers Willie a lucrative job. Guest star: Dan Castellaneta as Steve Michaels The episode title is based on the Bee Gees song.
95	22	"Hungry Like the Wolf"	Nick Havinga	Paul Fusco	March 3, 1990	4021	17.4
After ALF stops eating due to a diet, he becomes more primitive in nature and goes to the park in order to hunt for food. Note: NBC moved ALF from Monday to Saturday nights beginning with this episode. Guest star: Jeff Doucette as Scooter The episode title is based on the Duran Duran song.
96	23	"I Gotta Be Me"	Paul Miller	Beverly Archer	March 10, 1990	4017	17.5
ALF is the only one excited about Lynn moving in with her boyfriend. Guest star: Dean Cameron as Robert Sherwood The episode title is based on the song popularized by Sammy Davis Jr.
97	24	"Consider Me Gone"	Nick Havinga	Story by : Ian Praiser; Teleplay by : Steve Pepoon, David Silverman, Stephen Sustarsic & Victor Fresco	March 24, 1990	4022	21.7
ALF hears from his alien friends Skip and Rhonda, who have established the colony of New Melmac and invite ALF to live with them. However, the U.S. Air Force’s Alien Task Force finally captures ALF as he is about to depart Earth. Guest star: Richard Fancy as Colonel Halsey Note: This episode originally ended with a "To Be Continued..." notice, as NBC did not cancel ALF until after its broadcast. A TV movie, Project: ALF, continued the story from this episode. The episode title is based on the Sting song.
