= ALF's Hit Talk Show =

- Genre: Talk show
- Presented by: ALF
- Country of origin: United States
- Original language: English
- No. of seasons: 1
- No. of episodes: 7

Production
- Camera setup: Multi-camera
- Running time: 23 minutes
- Production companies: Burt Dubrow Productions; Alien Productions

Original release
- Network: TV Land
- Release: July 7 – December 17, 2004

ALF's Hit Talk Show is an American cable television talk show that aired on TV Land from July 7 to December 17, 2004 for seven episodes. The host is the puppet character ALF, of 1980s television fame. At the beginning of each show, ALF is introduced by his "sidekick", Ed McMahon. The show ran in a 30-minute block and featured guests such as Drew Carey and Joe Mantegna. Prior to the series' debut, Entertainment Weekly described ALF's Hit Talk Show as "a one-shot, a lead-in" for TV Land's marathon of the original ALF sitcom.

== Format ==
The show's format is traditional, with ALF sitting behind a desk talking to celebrity guests who drop by for brief chats. In between, there is light banter and some prerecorded comedy skits, usually featuring McMahon or comic actor Kevin Butler. On ALF's desk is a large bowl of snack foods (such as popcorn or peanut brittle) which the guests are invited to eat. (ALF, being an alien and a puppet, does not partake.)

Running jokes on the show include ALF's stated penchant for eating cats, and McMahon's bewilderment at how he ended up saying "And now... Heeeere's ALF!" on a late-night cable show hosted by a B-list 1980s celebrity who is not even human.

== Reception ==
The show's pilot gained enough viewers to merit more episodes; however, ALF's Hit Talk Show was not a hit and is regarded among the greatest talk show flops. In 2009, GetBack.com included it with nine other programs on a list of the "Worst Talk Shows in TV History."

== Episodes ==
No.	Title	Original release date	Prod. code
1	July 7, 2004	Drew Carey & Dennis Franz cameos: Joan Rivers & Henry Winkler (Kevin Butler)	107
2	November 12, 2004	Joe Mantegna & Merv Griffin cameos: Jack Sheldon	105
3	November 19, 2004	Bryan Cranston & Leon Redbone	102
4	November 26, 2004	Tom Arnold & James Nelson and his talking dog (ventriloquist)	106
5	December 3, 2004	Doris Roberts & Kevin Butler (comic actor)	101
6	December 10, 2004	Tom Green & Linda Blair & Jack Sheldon (Kevin Butler)	104
7	December 17, 2004	Eric Roberts & Vincent Pastore	103
