= The Cindy Margolis Show =

- Genre: Comedy
- Written by: Steve Sobel; Emma Wilson
- Directed by: Joe DeMaio; Errol Falcon
- Presented by: Cindy Margolis
- Country of origin: United States
- Original language: English
- No. of seasons: 1
- No. of episodes: 15 (list of episodes)

Production
- Production locations: Miami Beach, Florida, United States
- Production companies: Burt Dubrow Productions; Visual Frontier

Original release
- Network: Syndication
- Release: August 18 – November 24, 2000

The Cindy Margolis Show is a (2000) television show filmed in Miami Beach, Florida, and hosted by Cindy Margolis. The premise of the show was to have a lot of young people party and dance around a stage on which various events took place such as bikini contests. The show was hosted by Margolis and Lance Krall with DJ Skribble providing dance music for the party goers.

== Episode list ==
1. Luau 8/18/2000
2. Pajama Party 8/25/2000
3. Disco 9/1/2000
4. The Big Show 9/8/2000
5. The King vs the Queen 9/15/2000
6. Frat Party 9/22/2000
7. Drag Night 9/29/2000
8. Bachelor Party 10/6/2000
9. T&A 10/13/2000
10. Ladies' Night 10/20/2000
11. Halloween Party 10/27/2000
12. Out of This World 11/3/2000
13. Springer Break 11/10/2000
14. Big Pimpin' 11/17/2000
15. Thanksgiving Party 11/24/2000
