= Tom Patchett =

American film director, screenwriter, actor and producer

- Born: East Lansing, Michigan, United States
- Occupations: Film; director; screenwriter actor; producer

Tom Patchett is an American film director, screenwriter, actor and producer who is best known as the co-creator of ALF. He co-wrote the films Up the Academy, The Great Muppet Caper, The Muppets Take Manhattan, and Project: ALF. He also wrote episodes of The Bob Newhart Show, We've Got Each Other, The Tony Randall Show, The Carol Burnett Show, and Buffalo Bill. Patchett founded the contemporary art gallery, Track 16, in 1994.

In the 1970s and 1980s, he was in a partnership with Jay Tarses, who first met in 1971, working on television scripts, and created Open All Night and Buffalo Bill for The Brillstein Company. He later worked for The Brillstein Company, creating the show Alf, before starting Patchett Kaufman Entertainment.

In 1988, Patchett, along with Kenneth Kaufman, formerly of Telecom Entertainment, founded its own production company, Patchett Kaufman Entertainment, to produce television movies. The company was mainly focused on the genre of law enforcement. Patchett and Kaufman first met while Kaufman was working at Telecom in the mid 1980s to develop a series of television specials. The company is best known for the series of In the Line of Duty television movies. The company also produced television adaptations of hit movies Working Girl and Bagdad Cafe, neither lasted as long as one season.
