= Heidi Zeigler =

Former child actress from the United States

- Born: March 26, 1979 (age 47); Lansing, Michigan, US
- Years active: 1982–1992

Heidi Zeigler (born March 26, 1979) is a former child actress from the United States. Zeigler's most notable roles were in the television series Rags to Riches (1986–1988) and Just the Ten of Us (1988–1990).

== Life and career ==
Beginning her career at age three, she appeared in approximately 20–30 national commercials (for products including Barbie, Kraft Cheese, Kool-Aid, Cheerios, McDonald's, and Clorox) before being cast at age four in TV's Mr. Mom (starring Barry Van Dyke). Mr. Mom did not survive past its pilot episode. At five, Zeigler landed roles in two television movies, Ernie Kovacs: Between the Laughter (starring Jeff Goldblum and Cloris Leachman) and California Girls (starring Robby Benson, Ernie Hudson, Doris Roberts and Zsa Zsa Gabor).

Zeigler was cast as Mickey in NBC's Rags to Riches. Set in the 1960s, Zeigler played the role of "Mickey Foley". Her character was the youngest of a group of six orphan girls who were adopted by a wealthy businessman (Joseph Bologna). Among her co-stars were Tisha Campbell-Martin, Kimiko Gelman, and Heather McAdam.

She won the 1987 Young Artist Award under the category of "Best Child Actress Under Age Ten", and was nominated for two Young Artist Awards (1988, 1990) for her work on Just the Ten of Us.

Shortly after the cancellation of Rags to Riches in 1988, Zeigler landed the role of "Sherry Lubbock" on ABC's Just the Ten of Us, which was a spin-off of ABC's Growing Pains. Zeigler appeared on two episodes of Growing Pains before commencing production on Just the Ten of Us. The show lasted for over three seasons before its cancellation in 1990.

Following production of the last episode of Just the Ten of Us in 1990, Zeigler made several guest appearances on various television shows before she was cast in her first feature film, There Goes the Neighborhood (Paramount Pictures, 1992). Playing the part of "Swan Babitt", she was a supporting actress as a member of the film's (Jeff Daniels, Catherine O'Hara, Héctor Elizondo, Chazz Palminteri, Rhea Perlman, Dabney Coleman).

Just months after the production concluded, Zeigler was cast as a series regular on Fox Television's Drexell's Class (starring Dabney Coleman). Playing the role of "Nicole Finnigan", an elementary school student in Mr. Drexell's class, Zeigler's co-stars also included Jason Biggs, Matthew Lawrence, Brittany Murphy, and A. J. Langer.

Heidi Zeigler declared her retirement after Drexell's Class was cancelled in 1992, citing her desire to attend public school.

== Filmography ==
Year	Title	Role	Other notes
1984	Mr. Mom (TV series)	Kate	TV series pilot
1984	Ernie Kovacs: Between the Laughter	Elizabeth Kovacs #1	TV movie
1985	California Girls	Betty	TV movie
1986	Amazing Stories	Deena	TV series; 1 episode ("Boo!")
1986	Rags to Riches	Mickey Foley	TV movie; series pilot
1987	ALF Loves a Mystery	Jo Hardy	TV movie
1987–1988	Rags to Riches	Mickey Foley	TV series; 23 episodes
1988	Growing Pains	Sherry Lubbock	TV series; 2 episodes
1988–1990	Just the Ten of Us	Sherry Lubbock	TV series; 47 episodes
1991–1992	Drexell's Class	Nicole Finnigan	TV series; 14 episodes
1992	There Goes the Neighborhood	Swan Babitt	Alternative title: Paydirt

== Awards and nominations ==
Year	Award	Result	Category	Series
1988	Young Artist Award	Won	Best Young Actress Under Ten Years of Age in Television or Motion Pictures	Rags to Riches
1989	Young Artist Award	Nominated	Best Young Actor/Actress Ensemble in a Television Comedy, Drama Series or Special	Just the Ten of Us (shared with Heather Langenkamp, Jamie Luner, Brooke Theiss, Matt Shakman and JoAnn Willette)
1990	Young Artist Award	Nominated	Best Young Actress Supporting Role in a Television Series	Just the Ten of Us
