= JoAnn Willette =

American actress (born 1963)

Joann Willette
- Born: October 12, 1963 (age 62); Lewiston, Maine, U.S.
- Other names: Jo Ann Willette; Joanne Willette; Joann Willette
- Occupation: Actress
- Years active: 1983–present
- Spouse: Mark Amato (m. 1992–2006)

Joann Willette (born October 12, 1963) is an American actress.

Willette is best known for appearing in the role of Constance "Connie" Lubbock in the television series Just the Ten of Us from 1988 to 1990. She has also made appearances on a number of other series including The Facts of Life, T. J. Hooker, Santa Barbara, Growing Pains, Melrose Place, Chicago Hope, Becker, ER, The Young and the Restless, My Sister Sam, Private Practice, The New Adventures of Old Christine, and in movies such as A Nightmare on Elm Street 2: Freddy's Revenge and Welcome to 18. She also appeared in the 1986 music video "Your Love" by The Outfield.

On June 4, 2014, Willette appeared on Ken Reid's TV Guidance Counselor Podcast.

== Award nominations ==
Year	Award	Result	Category	Series
1989	Young Artist Award	Nominated	Best Young Actor/Actress Ensemble in a Television Comedy, Drama Series or Special	Just the Ten of Us (shared with Heather Langenkamp, Jamie Luner, Brooke Theiss, Matt Shakman and Heidi Zeigler)
