= The Vancouver Observer =

Canadian news websites

- Type: Daily news website and blog
- Format: Online newspaper
- Owner: Observer Media Group
- Editor-in-chief: Linda Solomon Wood
- Founded: 2006
- Language: English
- City: Vancouver, British Columbia
- Country: Canada
- Website: www.vancouverobserver.com

The Vancouver Observer is an independent online newspaper. The site was founded in 2006 by journalist Linda Solomon as an online platform for Vancouver bloggers, writers, reporters, photographers and filmmakers. Novelist Ruth Ozeki was involved in the early stages of the site as an adviser. The Vancouver Observer covers local politics, arts, the environment, technology, health, nutrition, and other topics. It also provides online events listings and a forum for individuals to upload their own stories. The Observer also has a YouTube channel, which features interviews and mini-documentaries.

== Awards and recognition ==
The Vancouver Observer won the Canadian Journalism Foundation Excellence in Journalism Award in June 2014 for local/regional reporting. Finalists in the category included Global Calgary and CBC Edmonton. Vancouver Observer reporter Matthew Millar broke the story about Canada's Security Intelligence Review Committee chair Chuck Strahl working as a registered lobbyist for Enbridge, resulting in his resignation. The Vancouver Observer also broke a story about Canada's National Energy Board, a federal energy regulator, coordinating with police for monitoring of environmental advocates involved in the joint review panel hearings on the Enbridge Northern Gateway pipeline proposal. At the award ceremony, Vancouver Observer publisher Linda Solomon announced the upcoming launch of a national news site, the National Observer, with a focus on energy and federal politics.

The Vancouver Observer won first place in Masthead's 2010 Canadian Online Publishing Awards green division for best online-only articles for its "Lost Canadians" series, by Darren Fleet and Megan Stewart, who were both completing their master's degrees at University of British Columbia Journalism School at the time. The Vancouver Observer was also a finalist in three categories in the 2011 Awards: Best Overall Website, Best Online-Only Articles, and Best Newsletter.

== Canada's National Observer ==
Canada's National Observer, launched in 2015, is the national offshoot of The Vancouver Observer. The site was founded through a Kickstarter campaign.
