= Thies (name) =

Thies is a north German and Dutch name originating from the given name Matthias. It may refer to

Given name

- Thies Christophersen (1918–1997), German Holocaust denier
- Thies Kaspareit (born 1964), German equestrian

Surname

- Annelies Thies (born 1969), Dutch sailor
- Bill Thies, American computer scientist
- Brian Thies, American comic book creator
- Dave Thies (born 1937), American professional baseball pitcher
- Dré Thies (born 1967), American rower
- Dick Thies (born 1938), American actor
- Hans-Jürgen Thies (born 1955), German politician
- Jake Thies (1926–2013), American Major League Baseball pitcher
- Joyce Thies, American writer of romance novels
- Nancy Thies (born 1957), American gymnast
