= Jamie Luner =

American actress (born 1971)

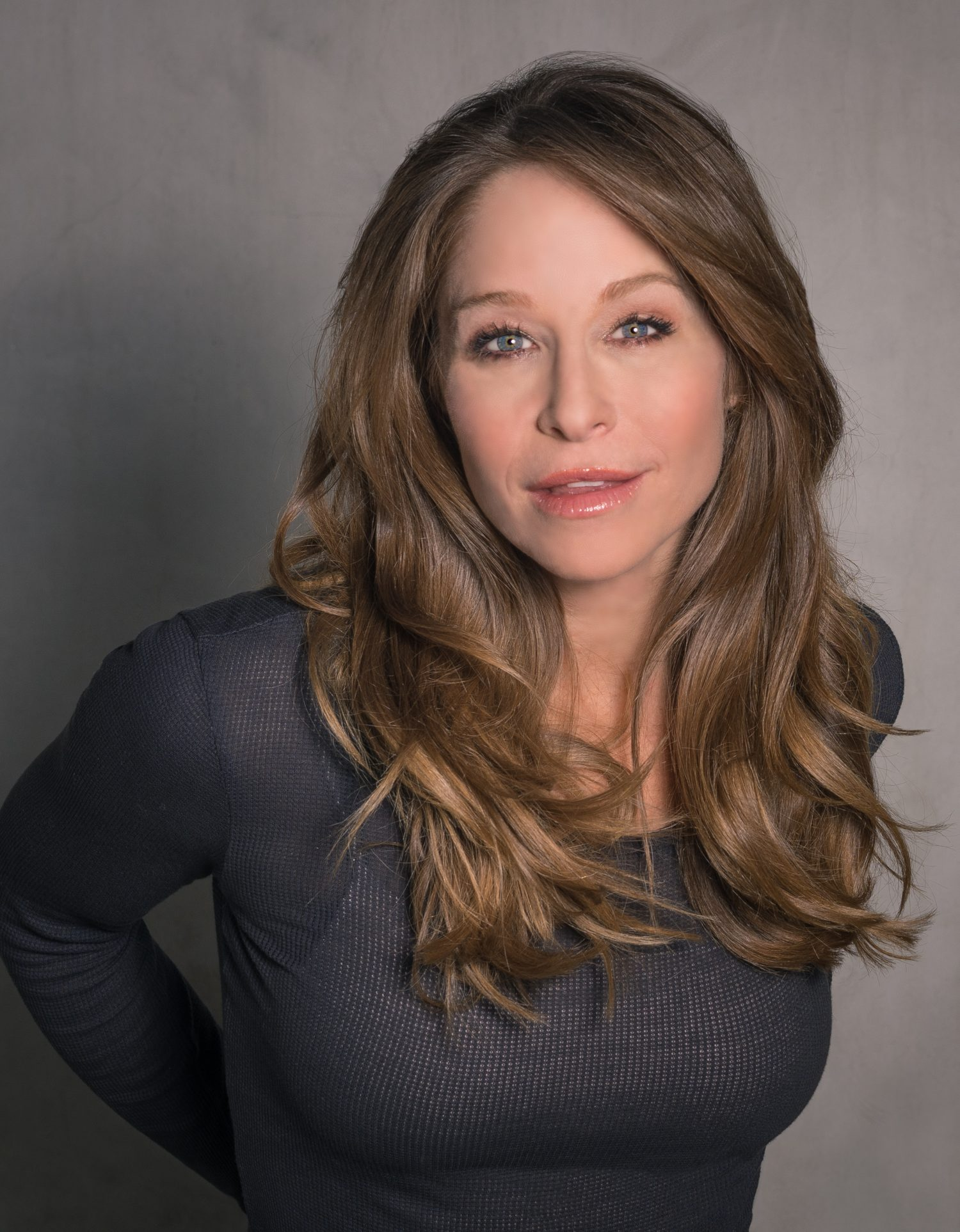
- Luner in 2019
- Born: May 12, 1971 (age 55); Palo Alto, California, U.S.
- Occupation: Actress
- Years active: 1975–present

Jamie Luner (born May 12, 1971) is an American actress. She is widely known for her roles as Cindy Lubbock on Just the Ten of Us, Peyton Richards on Savannah, Lexi Sterling on Melrose Place and Rachel Burke on Profiler. More recently, she portrayed Liza Colby on All My Children, and Cassie Siletti on Murder in the First.

== Early life ==
Jamie Luner was born in Palo Alto, California on May 12, 1971, to Susan and Stuart Luner. She has an older brother, David Luner, who also has had a robust career in the entertainment business. Luner attended Beverly Hills High School. Luner was heavily involved in the drama department during her high school career, and at age fifteen she won LA's Shakespeare Festival for the Individual Monologues category in 1988.

In between filming Growing Pains and Just the Ten of Us, Luner and her mother moved to New York to pursue Jamie's studies in entertainment. During 1986–1987, she attended the PCS Professional Children's School, which was established for providing working youth in the entertainment business with a basic education and curriculum. Simultaneously, she also studied at HB Studios to study dance with musical theater savant Ann Reinking.

At age sixteen, the producers of Growing Pains asked her to audition for their new spin-off Just the Ten of Us, and upon being cast for the role, Luner returned to California.

In 1994, when Luner was 23, she decided to pursue her passion for cooking and attended one of LA's top culinary schools, the Epicurean School of Culinary Arts, to study the fundamentals of fine French cuisine.

Following three and a half decades' worth of starring in films and television, in 2011 Luner went on to receive a master's degree in Spiritual Psychology at the Santa Monica College.

"I love learning and I wanted to further my education. I've always been on the spiritual path, and as a storyteller, the human psyche truly fascinates me. Brilliantly, school was set up as "experiential learning," so what I didn't expect was the profound internal transformation that occurred. It's been the gift that keeps on giving."

== Career ==
=== 1975–1994 ===
Luner's first role was playing the daughter of Suzanne Somers in a Crown Tissues commercial in 1975 at just four years old. From then on, she appeared regularly in commercials, making ten of them before the age of nine. Luner made her first television show appearance when she landed the role as the infamous Sheena ‘Woo Woo' Berkowitz in the hit sitcom Growing Pains (1987–1990). Although she was cast in only one episode to play one of three prom dates of main character Mike Seaver who was played by Kirk Cameron, she was often referenced throughout the rest of the series.

The very next year, Luner went on to star as Cindy Lubbock in the Growing Pains spinoff, Just the Ten of Us (1988–1990), where she played the daughter of Coach Graham Lubbock portrayed by actor Bill Kirchenbauer. It also starred Heather Langenkamp, Brooke Theiss and JoAnn Willette as Luner's fictional sisters.

She went on to play in Married… with Children (1992) on Fox with Christina Applegate and Ed O'Neill and the police drama Reasonable Doubts (1993) alongside Marlee Matlin.

Following her roles in these series, she landed her first film lead in 1993 as Diana Moffitt in a television movie Moment of Truth: Why My Daughter?, starring opposite Linda Gray and Antonio Sabàto, Jr.

Luner continued with a succession of television films, most notably Confessions of a Sorority Girl (1994) which debuted on Showtime and was directed by Uli Edel and co-starred Alyssa Milano.

Her first role in a multitude of crime dramas was Diagnosis Murder (1994), with renowned actor Dick Van Dyke.

=== 1994–2000 ===
In 1994, Luner expanded her education and passion for cooking and joined the Epicurean School of Culinary Arts which taught classical French cuisine in Los Angeles, California.

"I grew up in a very food-oriented family, a lot of cooking, a lot of eating, and I have a passion for it, so I put myself through culinary school."

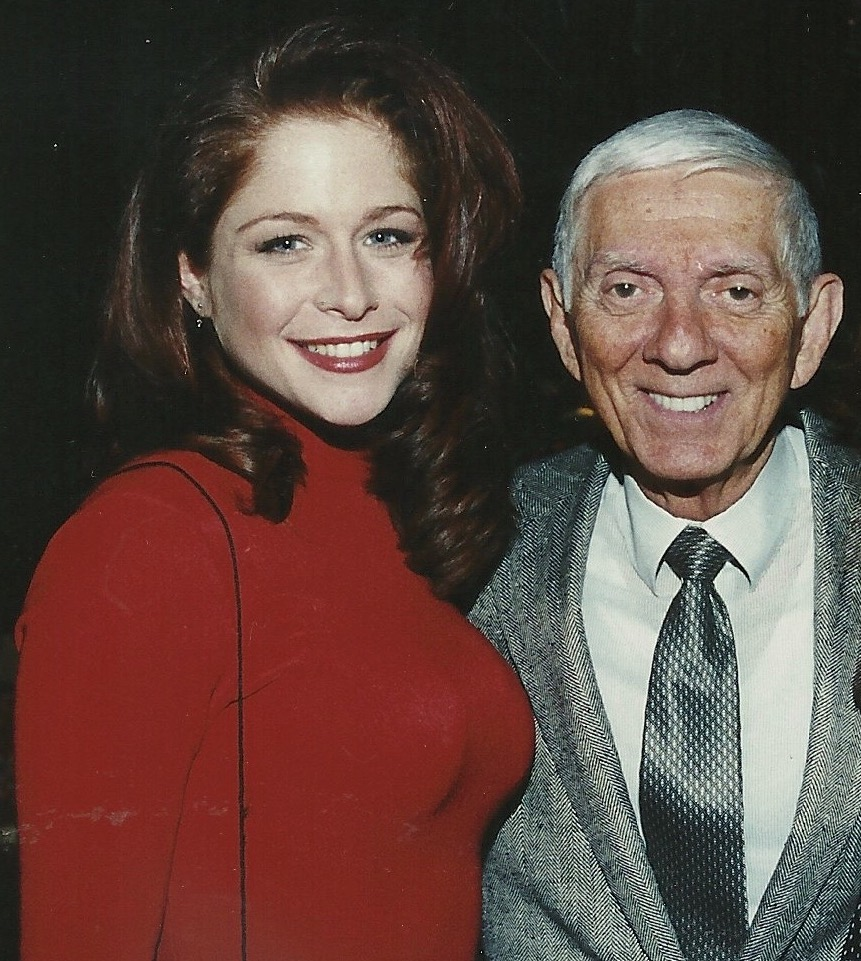
Jamie Luner & Aaron Spelling

Luner's major rise to prominence came in 1996, when she was cast for the first of many times by well-known producer Aaron Spelling. She joined the series as southern vixen Peyton Richards in the prime-time soap opera, Savannah (1996–1997), which was the signature show on the newly launched WB Television Network. Luner starred alongside other notable actors such as Robyn Lively, Shannon Sturges, George Eads, Ray Wise, and Mimi Kennedy. Luner had moved to Atlanta, Georgia during the filming of this series, and once it concluded, bought an airstream and traveled the United States for eight months before landing on a lot in Malibu.

It was not long before Spelling then invited her to play Lexi Sterling on the iconic television series Melrose Place (1997–1999), for which Luner's performance gained global recognition. During these final two and a half seasons, the show followed her rivalry with Amanda Woodward played by Heather Locklear, ultimately portraying Luner's character as the alpha female.

Soon thereafter, Luner received an invitation from the NBC network to replace Ally Walker on Profiler (1997–2000). She played the role as Rachel Burke alongside Robert Davi, Roma Maffia, and Julian McMahon until the show came to a close at the end of its fourth season in 2000.

Luner's character also appeared in a cross-over episode on The Pretender (1998–2000), a television series that had a shared universe with Profiler.

=== 2000–2020 ===
Following the conclusion of Profiler, Luner starred alongside Michael Madsen and Diane Farr in the thriller Sacrifice (2000).

In November of the same year, she played in The Drew Carey Show (2000), with host Drew Carey.

Around that time, Luner also decided to attend a program at a cake decorating school for eight months.

Luner had guest appearances on several series including That's Life (2001) and CSI: Miami (2002) with David Caruso.

Between 2003 and 2004, Luner was cast as a series regular in another Spelling drama to play the role as Senior Deputy Ryan Layne in 10-8: Officers on Duty with Ernie Hudson and Danny Nucci.

In 2004, Luner guest-starred in an episode of NCIS, with well-known actors Mark Harmon and Michael Weatherly.

In the early 2000s, Luner starred in many thrillers such as Stranger in My Bed (2005), Blind Injustice (2005), The Suspect (2006), The Perfect Marriage (2006).

In 2006, she also guest-starred in The War at Home with Michael Rapaport, and Rami Malek. And in 2007, she had a guest appearance in CSI: Crime Scene Investigation with Marg Helgenberger on CBS.

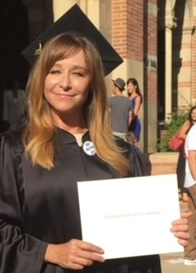
Jamie Luner graduating from University of Santa Monica

Another one of Luner's most well-known works was as a series regular in All My Children (2009–2011) as Liza Colby for 296 episodes, with Chrishell Stause and Susan Lucci.

Luner went on to pursue her lifelong passion in spiritual wellness. She attended USM during 2011 and 2012, ultimately learning life-lasting skills and knowledge on self-awareness and healing.

Following the conclusion of this series, Luner had a guest appearance in the cult classic dark fantasy Supernatural (2012) on CW.

She went on to guest star in the police procedural crime drama Criminal Minds (2013) with Matthew Gray Gubler and Shemar Moore. That same year she landed a role in The Glades (2013) on A&E, and played the main villainess in The Perfect Boss (2013).

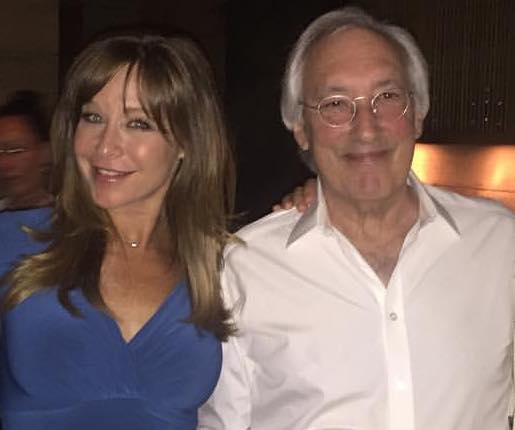
Jamie Luner & Steven Bochco

The following year, she had a comedic appearance on Two and a Half Men (2014) with Jon Cryer and Ashton Kutcher, and also guest-starred in the fantasy horror drama True Blood (2014).

The next year, Luner played in the medical drama Code Black with lead woman Marcia Gay Harden. Later, she landed an enticing role in the then up-and-coming legal drama Better Call Saul (2015) with Bob Odenkirk, which was written by Vince Gilligan.

Between 2015 and 2016, Luner landed a recurring role as Cassie Siletti in Murder in the First with Currie Graham, Taye Diggs and Kathleen Robertson. At first, she had only been signed on for two episodes, but once producer Steven Bochco saw the chemistry on screen between her and Graham, they became the ‘television couple to watch' and the producers decided to keep her on for the entirety of the next season.

"It was exciting to watch Bochco expand my storyline with Currie Graham, and I am so blessed to work with him. It is a rare experience when you get an acting partner that you're so in sync with. Showing up that way raises the bar."

In 2016 she played the lead character in A Mother's Revenge (aka Trial), and a year later she played the protagonist in A Lover Betrayed (2017) with Maurice Benard.

=== 2020–present ===
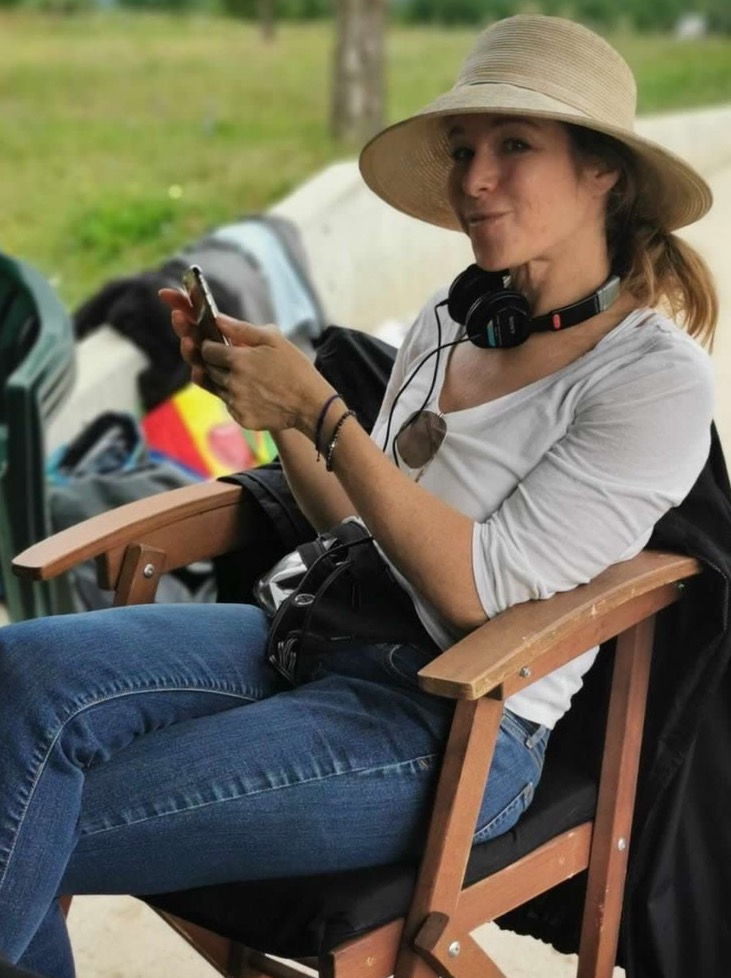
Jamie Luner on set

In 2019, Luner produced her first movie, The Christmas High Note (2020), for which she also starred as lead, and both wrote her first song and performed it in the movie. This movie premiered on "It's a Wonderful Lifetime" holiday lineup that year.

That same year, Luner went to Sofia, Bulgaria to produce and co-star in the romantic comedy Lost & Found in Rome (2021). The last day of filming coincided with the first day of shutdown for the COVID-19 pandemic, and Luner returned to Los Angeles.

Only a couple months into COVID-19, Luner returned to Bulgaria to produce the movies Valley of Love (2023) and I'm with Me (2023). While filming for most movies slowed down during the pandemic, Luner was able to produce these in the countryside where the laws for social distancing were not as limiting.

That same year she produced another film For Better or Worse (2023) and played the main character.

== Appearances ==
In 1997, she was invited to The Rosie O'Donnell Show with host Rosie O'Donnell.

That same year she was invited to the syndicated radio talk show Loveline.

Luner was invited to the Martin Short Show with Martin Short along with Conan O'Brien in 1999.

The following year she was invited back to The Tonight Show with Jay Leno alongside William Shatner.

In 2009, Luner was invited to attend the talk show The View, and was interviewed about her roles on Melrose Place and All my Children by the hosts including Joy Behar and Sherri Shephard, Whoopi Goldberg.

That same year, she attended the 36th Annual Daytime Emmy Awards ceremony with her grandmother.

== Theater ==
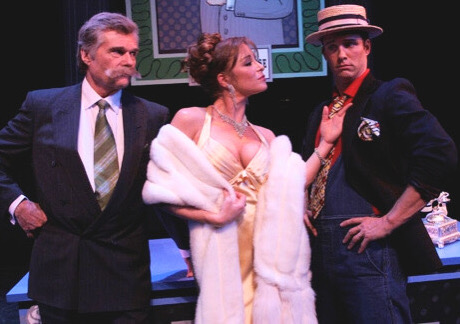
Jamie Luner in a theater production

Luner was cast in the musical Li'l Abner, which is based on the comic strip Li'l Abner by Al Capp. It was produced by Tony Award winner Jason Alexander at the UCLA Theater.

== Filmography ==
=== Film ===
Year	Film	Role	Notes
1993	Moment of Truth: Why My Daughter?	Diana Moffitt	Television film
1994	The St. Tammany Miracle	Lootie	
1994	Tryst	Mindy	
1994	Moment of Truth: Cradle of Conspiracy	Donna	Television film
1994	Confessions of a Sorority Girl	Sabrina Masterson	Television film
1999	Friends & Lovers	Model	
1999	The Force	Stacey	Television film
2000	Sacrifice	Naomi Cohen	Television film
2002	Warrior	Eldoran's Girl Friend	
2003	Threshold	Savannah Bailey	Television film
2005	The Suspect	Beth James	Television film
2005	Blind Injustice	Diana Scott	Television film
2005	Stranger in My Bed	Sara Hansen	Television film
2006	The Perfect Marriage	Marrianne Danforth/Annie Grayson	Television film
2007	Nuclear Hurricane	Linda	Television film
2009	Heat Wave	Kate Jansen	Television film
2009	Trust	Sandra	Television film
2012	Walking the Halls	Holly Benson	Television film
2012	Stalked at 17	Trini Marshall	Television film
2013	The Perfect Boss	Jessica Slate	Television film
2013	Out of Reach	Dianne	
2013	The Cheating Pact	Ms. Walters	Television film
2015	The Wrong Girl	Ashley Allen	Television film
2015	The Bride He Bought Online	Rihanne Lindstrom	Television film
2016	Trial	Jennifer Clarke	Television film, also executive producer
2016	A Mother's Revenge	Jennifer Clark	Television film
2017	A Lover Betrayed	Tess Nolans	Television film, also executive producer
2018	Deadly Runaway	Suzanne	Television film
2019	My Adventures with Santa	La Befana	Also associate producer
2019	Tell Me I Love You	Julie	
2020	The Christmas High Note	Rachel	Television film
2021	Lost & Found in Rome	Diana Jensen	Television film
2022	For Better or Worse	Jessa Putman	Television film, also executive producer
2022	Valley of Love		Television film, producer
2022	I'm with Me		Television film, producer

=== Television ===
Year	Title	Role	Notes
1987–1990	Growing Pains	Cindy / Kara Daye / Sheena Berkowitz	4 episodes
1988–1990	Just the Ten of Us	Cindy Lubbock	Main cast
1992	Bill & Ted's Excellent Adventures	Roxanne	TV pilot
1992	Married with Children	Gerri	Episode: "Frat Chance"
1993	Reasonable Doubts	Tiffany Beaman	Episode: "Crumbling Systems"
1994	Diagnosis Murder	Kimmy Marlowe	Episode: "The Last Laugh: Part One"
1994	Rebel Highway	Sabrina Masterson	Episode: "Confessions of a Sorority Girl"
1996–1997	Savannah	Peyton Richards Massick	Main cast
1997–1999	Melrose Place	Lexi Sterling	Main cast (seasons 6–7)
1999–2000	Profiler	Rachel Burke	Title character (season 4)
2000	The Pretender	Rachel Burke	Episode: "Spin Doctor" (Profiler crossover)
2000	The Drew Carey Show	Jenny	Episode: "Drew and Kate Become Friends"
2001	The Outer Limits	Candace Maguire	Episode: "Mind Reacher"
2001	That's Life	Samantha Richardson	3 episodes
2002	CSI: Miami	Nikki Olson	Episode: "Breathless"
2003–2004	10-8: Officers on Duty	Senior Deputy Ryan Layne	8 episodes
2004	NCIS	Amanda Reed / Lt. Cmdr. Hamilton Voss	Episode: "Dead Man Talking"
2006	The War at Home	Jodi	Episode: "Three's Company"
2007	CSI: Crime Scene Investigation	Elizabeth Rodriguez	Episode: "Lying Down with Dogs"
2009–2011	All My Children	Liza Colby	312 episodes
2012	Supernatural	Annie Hawkins	Episode: "Of Grave Importance"
2013	Criminal Minds	Madison Riley	Episode: "Magnum Opus"
2013	The Glades	Willa Garbett	Episode: "Happy Trails"
2014	Two and a Half Men	Tracy	Episode: "Lotta Delis in Little Armenia"
2014	True Blood	Amanda H-Vamp	Episode: "Death Is Not the End"
2014	Heartbreakers	Teresa Stone	Miniseries
2015	Better Call Saul	Dreamy Woman	Episode: "Mijo"
2015–2016	Murder in the First	Cassie Siletti	Recurring role
2015	Code Black	Candace Clark	Episode: "Cardiac Support"
