= Sacrifice (2000 film) =

- Poster
- Based on: The Sacrifice by Mitchell Smith
- Written by: Randall Frakes
- Directed by: Mark L. Lester
- Starring: Michael Madsen; Bokeem Woodbine; Jamie Luner; Diane Farr; Deborah Shelton
- Music by: Stephen Edwards
- Country of origin: United States
- Original language: English

Production
- Producers: Dana Dubovsky; Mark L. Lester
- Cinematography: Robert Steadman
- Editor: Christopher Roth
- Running time: 90 minutes
- Production companies: American World Pictures; Lions Gate Films

Original release
- Network: HBO
- Release: June 23, 2000

Sacrifice is a 2000 thriller television film, starring Michael Madsen. It was written by Randall Frakes, based on a novel by Mitchell Smith and directed by Mark L. Lester.

== Plot ==
Tyler Pierce, a convicted bank robber who just recently escaped from prison, joins with a former call girl to investigate the murder of his daughter. They soon discover that they are dealing with a serial killer.

== Cast ==
- Michael Madsen as Tyler Pierce
- Bokeem Woodbine as FBI Agent Gottfried
- Michelle Lintel as FBI Agent Hildebrandt
- Jamie Luner as Naomi Cohen
- Diane Farr as Karen Yeager
- Deborah Shelton as Margaret Sackett
- Jordan Williams as Carl Sackett
- Tony Abatemarco as Phil Lombardi
- Marco St. John as Dr. Hector Salcodo
- Joshua Leonard as Jason

== Reception ==
Andy Webb from The Movie Scene gave the film three out of five stars and wrote: "What this all boils down to is that "Sacrifice" is really a bad movie; it has weak acting, poor action and irrelevant subplots. Yet all the wrong stuff ends up being as entertaining as the right stuff which makes "Sacrifice" surprisingly enjoyable." Richard Scheib from Moria.co gave it two stars, stating: "Sacrifice starts well. Michael Madsen’s central character is unusually conceived as a hero goes and the film is tightly plotted, consistently keeping one’s interest. Alas, Sacrifice fails to sustain such interest for its full length. Indeed, despite the unusualness of the central character and an interesting plot set-up, by about halfway point all of this has dissipated and Sacrifice has become merely a routine policier." Jack Sommersby from eFilmCritic gave the movie two stars and wrote: "The film isn't terrible, just terribly dull, with a who-cares hero registering near zero on both the dramatic and charismatic scale. I'd be happy to predict that Madsen probably has a good film in him somewhere down the line, but after seeing his 2009 slate of no less than twenty-eight(!) projects, it's safe to concretely conclude that here's an ultra-slumming actor preferring quantity over quality. A The Wrestler couldn't come along soon enough."
