= Rex Solomon =

American jewelry store owner and former capella directory publisher

Rex Solomon (born March 1966) is an American jewelry store owner and former capella directory publisher.

== Biography ==
Rex Solomon a fifth generation Texan, was born in March 1966, and raised in Houston, attending Williston Northampton School in Easthampton, Ma. He is a grandson of notable Harvard psychiatrist Philip Solomon, and the step grandson of his second wife, U.S. Senator Maurine Brown Neuberger, son of landscape photographer Andrew Solomon & Dana Donsky Solomon, nephew of music critic/writer Linda Solomon and brother of filmmaker Keith Solomon.

A 1988 graduate of Brandeis University, also studied at Tufts University and Harvard University. He was a founding member of the first fraternity at Brandeis University, the Lambda Beta chapter of Alpha Epsilon Pi. While at Brandeis was the founding president of the Barrister News, an independent weekly paper serving the university. Mr. Solomon was a member of the Varsity Sailing Team

Mr. Solomon attended the University of Houston Law School in the fall of 1989, where he founded The List, the first national directory, of a cappella groups, and an arrangement exchange which combined to cofound with Deke Sharon's Contemporary A Cappella Society, where he served as the publisher/printer for the initial year of operation. Mr. Solomon was briefly mentioned in "Pitch Perfect: The Quest for Collegiate A CAPPELLA Glory" by Mickey Rapkin.

== Career ==
After a year of law school, in 1990 Solomon became active in his Houston-based family jewelry store, Houston Jewelry, where since 2005 he has served as president. Solomon is the Immediate Past President of the Texas Jewelers Association, and serves on the board of the Texas Retailers Association. He was a guest editor of Modern Jeweler Magazine, and a featured speaker at the JCK Las Vegas Jewelry Show. Solomon serves on the National Advisory Board of the Main Street Growth & Opportunity Coalition. He is a frequent contributor on Kevin Price's Show The Price of Business Radio on KTEK and the BizTv Network.

== Communal Service ==
In 2020 Mr. Solomon was elected to the Board of the Better Business Bureau of Greater Houston & South Texas. Since 2016 Mr. Solomon has served on the Board of Seven Acres Home for the Aged. Mr. Solomon has been active in the Anti Defamation League's Security Committee for many years. Mr. Solomon is a member of the Gentlemen's Committee of the American Cancer Society's Cattle Baron's Ball by Victory. He continues as an ardent supporter of Victory.

== Awards ==
Two time honoree as one of America's Best Jewelers by National Jeweler and the Jewelers of America, as well as the winner of multiple Telly Awards as a producer, multiple BBB's Award for Excellence, and the State of Texas Historical Commission Texas Treasure Award in 2008. National Retail Federation 2015 & 2016 Retail Champion Award.
