= Passions (1984 film) =

- Genre: Drama
- Written by: Janet Greek; Robin Maxwell
- Directed by: Sandor Stern
- Starring: Joanne Woodward; Lindsay Wagner; Richard Crenna; Mason Adams; Heather Langenkamp
- Music by: Bruce Broughton
- Country of origin: United States
- Original language: English

Production
- Executive producer: John J. McMahon
- Producer: Bobbi Frank
- Cinematography: Frank Stanley
- Editor: Leon Carrere
- Running time: 92 minutes
- Production companies: Carson Productions; Warner Bros. Television; Wizan TV Enterprises

Original release
- Network: CBS
- Release: October 1, 1984

Passions is a 1984 American made-for-television drama film written by Janet Greek and Robin Maxwell and directed by Sandor Stern. The film stars Joanne Woodward, Lindsay Wagner, Richard Crenna, Mason Adams and Heather Langenkamp. The plot focuses on a widow who discovers her late husband led a double life and had a son with another woman during the course of their marriage. The film premiered on CBS and while the performances were met with positive reviews, the storyline has been met with some criticism.

== Plot ==
Businessman Richard Kennerly is married to the socialite Catherine, and they have a daughter, Beth. Richard leads a seemingly normal life in Beverly Hills with his wife and daughter, but this masks an affair he has been having for the past 8 years with an artist, Nina Simon, with whom he has a six-year-old son, Eric. Richard set Nina and their son up in a beachside home in Malibu and has been living a double life. Catherine is unaware of Nina and Richard's relationship, while Nina accepts the circumstances for what they are and continues the affair.

While at home with his wife and daughter, Beth explains to Richard that she wants to move out with her boyfriend. Richard soon becomes severely ill and dies. The double life that he once lived is exposed. Catherine discovers the extramarital relationship that he had and becomes aware of who his mistress was.

Devastated, Catherine discovers Richard's son, Eric, with Nina but realizes that he left nothing for the child. Catherine and Nina begin to feud, and Catherine refuses to acknowledge the child's existence. Nina wants her son's education to be paid for, but Catherine clashes with her. The two women get into a fist fight at Richard's funeral. However, they soon realize that they were both manipulated by him and settle their differences.

== Cast ==
- Joanne Woodward as Catherine Kennerly
- Lindsay Wagner as Nina Simon
- Richard Crenna as Richard Kennerly
- Mason Adams as Ron Sandler
- Heather Langenkamp as Beth Kennerly
- John Considine as Jack Blaine
- R.J. Williams as Eric
- Viveca Lindfors as Lila

== Reception ==
The film has been met with mixed reviews. Joanna Berry of Radio Times praised Woodward and Wagner's performances but described the film as "predictable". Jeff Jarvis of People said "There’s drama here and rich human interaction." and praised the direction of the film and the performances of Woodward, Wagner, Crenna, and Langenkamp.
