= For the People (2002 TV series) =

- Genre: Legal drama
- Created by: Catherine LePard
- Starring: Lea Thompson; A Martinez; Michael Reilly Burke
- Composer: Wendy Blackstone
- Country of origin: United States
- Original language: English
- No. of seasons: 1
- No. of episodes: 18

Production
- Running time: 60 minutes
- Production companies: Cumulus Productions; Lifetime Productions

Original release
- Network: Lifetime
- Release: July 21, 2002 – February 16, 2003

For the People is an American legal drama series that aired on Lifetime from July 21, 2002 until February 16, 2003.

== Premise ==
A liberal Los Angeles assistant district attorney gets a new conservative boss.

== Cast ==
- Lea Thompson as Camille Paris
- Debbi Morgan as Lora Gibson
- Cecilia Suárez as Anita Lopez
- A Martinez as Michael Olivas
- Michael Reilly Burke as Will Campbell
- Anne Dudek as Jennifer Carter
- Kimiko Gelman as Judith
- Derek Morgan as Thomas Gibson
- Wendy Gazelle as Erica
- Matthew Richards as Zach

== Episodes ==
| No. | Title | Directed by | Written by | Original release date |
|---|---|---|---|---|
| 1 | "Pilot" | Peter Werner | Catherine LePard | July 21, 2002 |
A young man is killed after a radio personality chastises homosexuals. The wife of a drug dealer plays an important part in putting him behind bars.
| 2 | "Our Own" | Eric Laneuville | Catherine LePard | July 28, 2002 |
Camille feels guilty over the death of a deputy district attorney. Jennifer and Anita tries to bring down a ring that stages auto accidents.
| 3 | "Lonely Hearts" | Ian Toynton | Judith Paige Mitchell | August 4, 2002 |
Camille works to bring down a con man who targets old and lonely women. Lora investigates an election scandal.
| 4 | "To DNA or Not to DNA" | Joe Napolitano | Denitra Trinise Harris | August 11, 2002 |
Camille and Lora disagree about the death penalty for a drug dealer. Anita works to arrest a woman who is being abuse towards her child.
| 5 | "Pawns" | Félix Enríquez Alcalá | Wendy West | August 18, 2002 |
Camille works on a case against an accused child abuser. Lora arrests a celebrity on solicitation charges.
| 6 | "Come Blow Your Whistle" | Joanna Kerns | Lawrence Meyers | August 25, 2002 |
Camille thinks a woman was killed for being a whistle blower.
| 7 | "The Double Standard" | David Jackson | Judith Paige Mitchell | September 8, 2002 |
Camille thinks a judge is being influenced by the good-looking wife of the defendant. Michael argues that the Three strikes law doesn't fit his client.
| 8 | "Textbook Perfect" | Elodie Keene | Denitria Harris-Lawrence | September 15, 2002 |
Camille must file a murder charge against a friend of Lora. Jennifer helps a group of adoptive parents who has been conned by an internet baby broker.
| 9 | "Honor Thy Mother" | Joe Napolitano | Unknown | October 6, 2002 |
Camille and Lora become suspicious when a string of fatal incidents happen at a hospital. Camille's runaway sister has stolen her identity.
| 10 | "Racing Form" | Steve De Jarnatt | Wendy West | October 13, 2002 |
A female jockey who was raped doesn't want to testify because it could ruin her career. Anita's sister is diagnosed with breast cancer.
| 11 | "Dog Day" | Allison Liddi-Brown | Suzanne Fitzpatrick and Eric Kornick | October 20, 2002 |
A convicted felon has taken hostages in an office in the DA building.
| 12 | "Crossroads" | Ian Toynton | Unknown | November 10, 2002 |
Camille and Michael find themselves on different sides in the trial of an alleged child molester and murderer. Erica's drug use may end up costing her custody.
| 13 | "The Reality of Lethality" | Steve De Jarnatt | Unknown | November 17, 2002 |
Camille fills in for Lora after she was injured by a criminal she helped put behind bars. Michael investigates a claim of police brutality.
| 14 | "Handle with Care" | Graeme Clifford | Denitria Harris-Lawrence | December 8, 2002 |
Camille takes on a case about a botched exorcism.
| 15 | "Nascent" | Carl Weathers | Wendy West | December 15, 2002 |
A newborn baby is found in a dumpster. Anita has to explain to her family that her marriage is over.
| 16 | "Nexus" | David Jackson | Suzanne Fitzpatrick and Eric Kornick | January 5, 2003 |
Hunter helps Camille with her nephew. A long-lost relative of Lora shows up with a family secret. A college student dies during the pledging ritual of a sorority.
| 17 | "Power Play" | Joanne Kerns | Sheryl J. Anderson | January 12, 2003 |
Lora, Anita and Michael investigate a young Hollywood star who drove her car into a group of people.
| 18 | "My Mother's Daughter" | Ian Sander | Unknown | February 16, 2003 |
Camille is stalked by a former co-worker. Lora's daughter is threatened by a carjacker.
