= Aaron Gelman =

American-Israeli artist

- אהרון גלמן
- Born: 24 November 1899; Hartford, Connecticut, United States
- Died: 1970 (aged 70–71); Israel
- Education: Hartford Academy of Art; Art Students' League; National Academy of Design
- Occupation: Artist
- Known for: Oils, pastels, etchings, drawings, sculptures
- Notable work: "Across the Gowanus Canal"
- Movement: New York School
- Relatives: Philip Solomon (brother-in-law); Linda Solomon (niece); Kimiko Gelman (granddaughter)

Aaron Gelman (Hebrew: אהרון גלמן; November 24, 1899 – May 1970) was an American artist. He worked on oils, pastels, etchings, drawings and sculptures. Gelman was born to Jewish immigrant parents from Petah Tikva, The Ottoman Palestine (present-day Israel). He died in Israel, where he had returned later in life.

== Education ==
Gelman studied at the Hartford Academy of Art, the Art Students’ League, and the National Academy of Design. Gelman was a member of the New York School, of which George Luks was the best known member. He was also a WPA artist. His painting "Across the Gowanus Canal" is in the collection of the Pennsylvania Academy of the Fine Arts.

== Personal life ==
Gelman was a brother-in-law to Philip Solomon, uncle to Linda Solomon, and one of his grandchildren is the actress Kimiko Gelman. His grandfather, Avraham Yaakov Gelman, was one of the 11 founding families of Mazkeret Batya (Ekron). These emigrant families came from Ruzhany, with support from the Baron de Rothschild, to settle Moshav Ekron. He was a close friend of fellow artist Harris "Harry" Rodvogin.
