= There Goes the Neighborhood (film) =

1992 American film by Bill Phillips

- Theatrical release poster by Jack Davis
- Directed by: Bill Phillips
- Written by: Bill Phillips
- Produced by: Stephen J. Friedman
- Starring: Jeff Daniels; Catherine O'Hara; Hector Elizondo; Rhea Perlman
- Cinematography: Walt Lloyd
- Edited by: Sharyn L. Ross
- Music by: David Bell
- Production company: Kings Road Entertainment
- Distributed by: Paramount Pictures
- Release date: October 30, 1992
- Running time: 88 minutes
- Country: United States
- Language: English

There Goes the Neighborhood, released as Paydirt in most foreign countries, is a 1992 comedy film directed by Bill Phillips, about a prison psychologist who is told, and three prison escapees who overhear, the hidden location of $8.5 million, and heads to New Jersey to find it.

== Plot ==
Prison psychologist Willis Embry reports for work at a New Jersey jail after his apartment has been burgled and his girlfriend has dumped him. In a supposedly private meeting later, a cancer-stricken elderly convict tells Willis about a job he pulled many years earlier: stealing $8.5 million of Mafia money, hidden in a casino skim bank. As a last request, he says that Willis can have half, and give the other half to a female friend named Louise. He tells Willis to go to Cherry Hill, New Jersey and dig in the basement 7322 Pleasant Street. In the next cell, inmates Lyle and Handsome Harry listen in to the conversation, but fail to hear the house number correctly, putting down 7320 instead. They escape from prison and disguise themselves as landscape gardeners. Their sociopathic accomplice Marvin has rigged Willis' apartment to explode, but he manages to escape the explosion, although the police think he died.

The following morning, Lyle, Harry, and Marvin arrive at 7320 and take the homeowners, Norman and Peedi Rutledge, hostage, while they start to dig in the basement. In order to disguise their operation, the crooks carry out landscaping duties in the yard, at Norman's suggestion. Meanwhile, Willis arrives next door at number 7322 and poses as a furnace engineer to get inside Jessie Lodge's house and scout the basement for the digging spot. When she realises he isn't an engineer she throws him out.

Over at 7320, Harry becomes obsessed with Peedi, and Norman continues to offer unsolicited advice to the prison escapees. Willis, meanwhile, is still trying to get into Jessie's house and breaks into the basement. Just as she is about to call the police, Willis reveals the truth, and says that he'll share his half with her. She agrees, they find the spot and start to dig.

The next day, the crooks notice Willis next door and soon realise that they are at the wrong house. Norman uses this event to his advantage, offering his help. He moves a jukebox from the wall and opens a door into a secret room full of contraband and weapons. He proposes a deal - they join forces and launch an assault next door to take the money by force. Lyle is not happy, but Marvin agrees, and Norman takes charge.

After a failed attempt at taking the house by force, Norman suggests that their existing hole be turned into a tunnel to next door, while Jessie and Willis continue digging. Not long after, Lyle and Harry break through in their tunnel but come up instead in Jessie's swimming pool, with the water coming back through into the basement. Peedi, still handcuffed to a chair, is released by Harry with a hacksaw before the room becomes completely flooded. Norman is nowhere to be seen. A suspicious neighbor has already called the police, and Marvin and Lyle attempt to escape via the front door with Lyle disguised as a woman.

After coming out of their front door with their hands up, Willis and Jessie realise that the police are only interested in the events next door, but Jessie's real estate agent Marty has noticed their suspicious behavior. Norman, emerges from Jessie's empty swimming pool in full scuba gear. Harry gives himself up to the police, while Lyle and Marvin's disguise is blown and they are arrested. Willis and Jessie find the money, but Norman and Marty both separately try to steal it from them. Jessie's young neighbor Swan knocks Marty out and the trio escape out the front door. The money is found to have gone to mush and therefore is completely useless. Norman and Marty are arrested by the police.

Later, as they sit in the hole in the basement and realize their true love for each other, Willis and Jessie notice a large bag of hidden gold coins. They drive away together to fulfil his bargain to give half of the money to the mysterious Louise.

== Cast ==
- Jeff Daniels as Willis Embry, a psychologist who works in a New Jersey prison who is told the secret location of $8.5 million buried under the basement of a house in Cherry Hill.
- Catherine O'Hara as Jessie Lodge, a divorcee who lives at 7322 Pleasant Street, Cherry Hill and strikes an agreement with Willis to find the money hidden under her basement.
- Hector Elizondo as Norman Rutledge, who lives at number 7320 Pleasant Street and is taken hostage by the escapees.
- Rhea Perlman as Lydia Nunn, a successful author who, with her husband Jeffrey, is constantly looking out her window at the comings and goings in the neighborhood.
- Judith Ivey as Peedi Rutledge, the long-suffering wife of Norm Rutledge.
- Harris Yulin as Marvin Boyd, a psychotic who breaks Lyle and Harry out of prison and spearheads the attempt at finding the loot.
- Jonathan Banks as Handsome Harry, the most sympathetic criminal who falls in love with Peedi while holding her and Norman hostage.
- Dabney Coleman as Jeffrey Babitt, Lydia's husband and step-father to her daughter Swan, who despises him.
- Chazz Palminteri as Lyle Corrente, the inmate who overhears the conversation about the $8.5 million.
- Richard Portnow as Marty Rollins, a real estate agent trying to sell Jessie's house, and is receiving help as a sexaholic.
- Jeremy Piven as Albert Lodge, the estranged husband of Jessie Lodge.
- Heidi Zeigler as Swan Babitt, the daughter of Lydia Nunn.
- William Morgan Sheppard as Trick Bissell, the convict who tells Willis about the money.

== Production ==
The film marked the directorial debut of screenwriter Bill Phillips.

=== Music ===
This film contains the Crowded House song "It's Only Natural", and the Tom Cochrane song "Life Is a Highway". The score was composed by David Bell.

== Critical and commercial performance ==
The film was not a commercial success. According to movie stats website The Numbers, the total US box office gross was a mere $11,000.

As of 16 May 2022, 1,200 individual users of IMDb had given this film a weighted average rating of 5.7.

== Home video ==
The film was released on VHS in most territories, and has not been made officially available on DVD in the USA (region 1) or the UK (region 2), although there are region 0 discs that are available.
