= Snowfall Trilogy =

Fantasy novel trilogy

The Snowfall Trilogy is a series of three fantasy novels written by Mitchell Smith. Set in a post-apocalyptic near future, the novels explore a vision of how the Earth might be after another Ice Age caused by Jupiter changing orbit. The cover artworks of all three books were illustrated by Michael Koelsch.

== Books ==
=== Snowfall ===
The first book in the series, released in February 2002, focuses on a group of hunter-gatherers

=== Kingdom River ===
The second book was released in June 2003.

=== Moonrise ===
Moonrise, released in April 2004, tells the story of Prince "Baj" Bajazet, adopted son of Sam Monroe, the Archiving King. When a coup backed by Boston wipes out the Middle Kingdom's royal family, save Bajazet, he becomes a man on the run. Rescued by three Moonrisers, who call themselves Persons - people who are part man and part animal, created by Boston - Baj joins them in their quest to harm the city.
