= Just the Ten of Us =

American television sitcom (1988–1990)

- Genre: Sitcom
- Created by: Dan Guntzelman; Steve Marshall
- Directed by: John Tracy (season 1)
- Starring: Bill Kirchenbauer; Deborah Harmon; Heather Langenkamp; Jamie Luner; Brooke Theiss; JoAnn Willette; Matt Shakman; Heidi Zeigler
- Opening theme: "Doin' It the Best I Can" performed by Bill Medley
- Composer: Steve Dorff
- Country of origin: United States
- Original language: English
- No. of seasons: 3
- No. of episodes: 47 (list of episodes)

Production
- Executive producers: Dan Guntzelman; Steve Marshall; Mike Sullivan
- Producers: Henry Johnson; Nick LeRose
- Running time: 22–24 minutes
- Production companies: Guntzelman-Sullivan-Marshall Productions; Warner Bros. Television

Original release
- Network: ABC
- Release: April 26, 1988 – May 4, 1990

Related
- Growing Pains

Just the Ten of Us is an American sitcom starring stand-up comedian Bill Kirchenbauer as Coach Graham Lubbock, a high school teacher/boy's basketball coach, and the head of a large Catholic family (with eight children) living in Eureka, California. The series is a spin-off of Growing Pains, in which Kirchenbauer portrayed the same character on a recurring basis. As the series progressed, Coach Lubbock's four eldest daughters, the teenagers Marie (Heather Langenkamp), Cindy (Jamie Luner), Wendy (Brooke Theiss), and Connie (JoAnn Willette), became the primary focus of the show.

Just the Ten of Us ran on ABC as a part of ABC's early TGIF programming block, starting with a partial series order of four episodes, running from April 26 to May 17, 1988. After the first four episodes received acceptable Nielson results, the series received a full season order. After another full season order, the show ended on May 4, 1990. A total of 47 episodes were produced.

== Synopsis ==
The series focuses on Graham Lubbock (Bill Kirchenbauer), a Catholic gym teacher and boy's basketball coach who used to teach at the high school that Growing Pains characters Mike and Carol Seaver (Kirk Cameron and Tracey Gold) had attended on Long Island and the father of eight children.

In the pilot episode (which aired on Growing Pains in the spring of 1988), Graham's job is in jeopardy due to district budget cutbacks. Mike leads a protest after he learns that Lubbock is trying to support a large family (including yet another baby on the way). Despite this, Graham loses his job but soon receives an offer at St. Augustine's Academy, an all-boys private Catholic school in Eureka, California. Graham and his pregnant wife Elizabeth (Deborah Harmon) promptly move their family to California.

By special arrangement, the older children — four teenage girls — were allowed to attend St. Augustine's, much to the school's administration's chagrin (and, of course, the male students' delight). They were:

- Marie (Heather Langenkamp) – the oldest, most responsible, and most pious.
- Cindy (Jamie Luner) – Wendy's older twin sister, and the most ditzy.
- Wendy (Brooke Theiss) – Cindy's younger twin sister, and the most flirtatious.
- Connie (JoAnn Willette) – the Bohemian, and also occasionally agnostic.

The younger children — two girls and two boys — were:

- 11-year-old Graham, Jr. (Matt Shakman), familiarly known as "J.R."
- eight-year-old Sherry (Heidi Zeigler)
- toddler Harvey (Jason and Jeremy Korstjens)
- infant Melissa – not yet born when the show began.

The first season consisted of four episodes for a trial run in the spring of 1988. ABC was pleased with their success and ordered a second season. In the second season, Cindy and Wendy seemed to switch personalities, with Cindy becoming more ditzy, and Wendy becoming the schemer. Also, the show focused more and more on the four older girls and frequently revolved around the family's efforts to save money, dating and other typical family sitcom issues. In later episodes, the four teenage girls formed a singing group called "The Lubbock Babes" (partly to help bring in much-needed extra income). The girls had many boyfriends and love interests that Graham took great pride in testing—and in most cases, fending off—but the most permanent fixture among them was Marie's goofy boyfriend, Gavin Doosler (Evan Arnold).

Those on the St. Augustine's staff included Father Robert Hargis (Frank Bonner), the affable headmaster; Coach Duane Johnson (Dennis Haysbert), Graham's earnest young assistant during the first two seasons and pulled some strings with Father Hargis to hire Lubbock; and in the third season, featured teachers Father Budd (Lou Richards) and elderly, madcap Sister Ethel (Maxine Elliott).

The show title has a double meaning, both representing the size of Coach Lubbock's family, as well as the size of a high school basketball team roster.

== Cast ==
- Bill Kirchenbauer as Coach Graham T. Lubbock
- Deborah Harmon as Elizabeth Lubbock
- Heather Langenkamp as Marie Lubbock
- Jamie Luner as Cynthia "Cindy" Lubbock
- Brooke Theiss as Wendy Lubbock
- JoAnn Willette as Constance Sarah "Connie" Lubbock
- Matt Shakman as Graham "J.R." Lubbock, Jr.
- Heidi Zeigler as Sherry Lubbock
- Jason and Jeremy Korstjens as Harvey Lubbock
- Frank Bonner as Father Robert Hargis, Headmaster of St. Augustine's Academy
- Dennis Haysbert as Duane Johnson, Coach Lubbock's assistant (1988–1989)
- Evan Arnold as Gavin Doosler
- Lou Richards as Father Bud (1989–1990)
- Maxine Elliott as Sister Ethel (1989–1990)

== Response ==
=== Ratings ===
A week after the series debuted on April 8, 1988, the show placed 7th in ratings. The second season garnered a total of 20.1 million viewers.

Despite garnering good ratings, the series was cancelled after three seasons. ABC wanted an adult-oriented sitcom to be the lead-in for 20/20, and had also signed a contract with Miller-Boyett Productions to create more content for the network. With Miller-Boyett already having three shows on TGIF, the network gave them the fourth slot, with the caveat that the show had to be an adult-oriented sitcom. Going Places took over the slot and aired for only one season before being cancelled due to low ratings.

After Just the Ten of Us was cancelled, an obsessive fan made threats against people associated with the program. Langenkamp later said the FBI investigated and warned her to be "very cautious about my comings and goings", which she found highly disturbing.

== Episodes ==
Season	Episodes	Originally released	
Season	Episodes	First released	Last released
1	4	April 26, 1988	May 17, 1988
2	20	October 28, 1988	April 28, 1989
3	23	September 13, 1989	May 4, 1990

Broadcast History

- April 1988 – May 1988, ABC Tuesday 8:30–9:00
- September 1988 – June 1989, ABC Friday 9:30–10:00
- July 1989, ABC Wednesday 8:30–9:00
- August 1989 – July 1990, ABC Friday 9:30–10:00

== Syndication ==
USA Network picked up the entire series in reruns shortly after it was canceled, and aired the show on a daily basis until 1996.

== International broadcast ==
In France, the show aired on Antenne 2 as part of a block called Giga in 1990 for 24 episodes, then on France 2 in 1996 under the name as Un toit pour dix (A Roof for Ten).

In Germany, the show aired on Pro 7 in 1990 under the name as Chaos hoch zehn (Chaos To The Power of Ten).

In Italy, the show aired on Canale 5 in 1992 under the name as Diece sono pochi (Ten is Not Enough).

In Spain, the show aired on Antena 3 in 1990 under the name as Somos Diez (There Are Ten of Us).

== Awards and nominations ==
Year	Award	Category	Recipient	Result
1989	ASCAP Film and Television Music Awards	Top TV Series	John Bettis	Won
1990	Primetime Emmy Award	Outstanding Lighting Direction (Electronic) for a Comedy Series	George Spiro Dibie (For episode "Highway To Heaven")	Won
1990	Young Artist Award	Best Young Actor/Actress Ensemble in a Television Comedy, Drama Series or Special	Heather Langenkamp, Jamie Luner, Matt Shakman, Brooke Theiss, JoAnn Willette and Heidi Zeigler	Nominated
1990	Young Artist Award	Best Family Television Series	Just the Ten of Us	Nominated
1990	Young Artist Award	Best Young Actress Supporting Role in a Television Series	Heidi Zeigler	Nominated
