= I Am Nancy =

- Home video release poster
- Directed by: Arlene Marechal
- Produced by: Heather Langenkamp; Arlene Marechal
- Starring: Heather Langenkamp; Robert Englund; Wes Craven
- Edited by: Troy Bogert
- Music by: Matthew Ian Cohen
- Production company: Some Pig Productions
- Release date: July 1, 2011
- Country: United States
- Language: English

I Am Nancy is a 2011 American documentary that follows actress Heather Langenkamp as she explores her role as Nancy Thompson in the A Nightmare on Elm Street films, the fandom that surrounds the franchise, and why most of it focuses on Freddy Krueger, rather than Nancy.

== Plot ==
Actress Heather Langenkamp attends several horror conventions across the globe as she interacts with fans to gain insight into why people are so drawn to the series and the characters of Nancy and Freddy. Additionally, she interviews Robert Englund and Wes Craven to understand what qualities make Nancy a definitive film hero.

== Cast ==
- Heather Langenkamp
- Robert Englund
- Wes Craven
- June Douglas
- Douglas Duart

== Production ==
Langenkamp was inspired to make a documentary about herself and Nancy after a receptionist rebuffed her efforts to contact director Wes Craven. The film was originally planned to coincide with the 25th anniversary of A Nightmare on Elm Street but was delayed for her participation in Never Sleep Again. Langenkamp felt that documentary did not answer all the questions that she had. Production took two years.

== Release ==
I Am Nancy premiered at the Days of the Dead film festival.

== Reception ==
Writing for HorrorNews.net, Dave Dreher praised it for its "tongue-in-cheek" approach and for being different from other documentary films; highlighting that it goes beyond being a familiar retrospective rehashing already known information, and its focus instead on horror conventions and the exploration of why both A Nightmare on Elm Street and Nancy are revered by horror fans. In a positive review for Dread Central, Emilie Noetzel wrote, "I Am Nancy is a must-see for fans of the A Nightmare on Elm Street series and of Heather Langenkamp. It is at times funny, at times quite serious, and oftentimes very touching. What really makes the documentary about Nancy, and Heather, feel so real and personal is that Heather understands the fact that Nancy is secondary to Freddy to most people, and she has no problem poking fun at herself."
