= Home Free (1993 TV series) =

1993 American television series

- Genre: Sitcom
- Created by: Richard Gurman; Tim O'Donnell
- Written by: Richard Gurman; Tim O'Donnell
- Directed by: James Widdoes
- Starring: Matthew Perry; Marian Mercer; Diana Canova; Anndi McAfee; Scott McAfee; Dan Schneider; Brooke Theiss; Alan Oppenheimer
- Opening theme: "Home Free" performed by Christopher Cross
- Composer: Mark Mothersbaugh
- Country of origin: United States
- Original language: English
- No. of seasons: 1
- No. of episodes: 13 (2 unaired)

Production
- Executive producers: Tim O'Donnell; Richard Gurman; Matthew Perry; James Widdoes; Julie Tsutsuir
- Producer: Todd Stevens
- Production locations: Stage 29, Universal Studios Hollywood; Universal City, California
- Running time: 30 minutes
- Production companies: Verbatim Productions; Center Field Productions; Universal Television

Original release
- Network: ABC
- Release: March 31 – July 2, 1993

Home Free is an American sitcom starring Matthew Perry, Marian Mercer and Diana Canova that aired on ABC from March 31 to July 2, 1993. The series was created by Tim O'Donnell and Richard Gurman.

== Cast ==
- Matthew Perry as Matt Bailey
- Marian Mercer as Grace Bailey
- Diana Canova as Vanessa Bailey
- Anndi McAfee as Abby Bailey
- Scott McAfee as Lucas Bailey
- Dan Schneider as Walter Peters
- Brooke Theiss as Laura
- Alan Oppenheimer as Ben Brookstone

== Episodes ==
No.	Title	Directed by	Written by	Original release date	Prod. code
1	"Pilot"	James Widdoes	Tim O'Donnell & Richard Gurman	March 31, 1993	68501
Matt Bailey's sister moves back to his mother's house with her kids.
2	"Family Ties"	James Widdoes	Rick Newberger	April 7, 1993	68508
3	"Front Page"	Tim O'Donnell	Tim O'Donnell & Richard Gurman	April 14, 1993	68506
4	"Prime Time"	James Widdoes	Rick Newberger	April 21, 1993	68513
5	"Pair O'Guys Lost"	James Widdoes	Rick Newberger & Nick LeRose	April 21, 1993	68511
6	"Shuttle Diplomacy"	James Widdoes	Carolyn Omine	May 28, 1993	68507
7	"The Abbysitter"	James Widdoes	Rick Newberger	June 4, 1993	68502
8	"The Groundlings"	James Widdoes	Sheryl Anderson	June 11, 1993	68503
9	"Can't Start a Fire Without a Spark"	James Widdoes	Lissa Levin	June 18, 1993	68512
10	"Nature of Things"	James Widdoes	Nick LeRose	June 25, 1993	68509
11	"Great Expectations"	James Widdoes	Sheryl Anderson & Carolyn Omine	July 2, 1993	68510
12	"Party Down"	James Widdoes	Jim Pond & Bill Fuller	Unaired	68504
13	"Secrets of Matt's Success"	James Widdoes	Nick LeRose	Unaired	68505
