= The St. Tammany Miracle =

- DVD Cover
- Directed by: Joy N. Houck, Jr. Jim McCullough Sr.
- Written by: Jim McCullough Jr.
- Produced by: Jim McCullough Sr. Jim McCullough Jr.
- Starring: Mark-Paul Gosselaar; Soleil Moon Frye; Jamie Luner
- Music by: Jay Weigel
- Distributed by: Heartland Films
- Release date: 1994
- Running time: 90 minutes
- Country: United States
- Language: English

The St. Tammany Miracle is a 1994 American sports drama film directed by Joy N. Houck, Jr. and Jim McCullough Sr. The film stars Mark-Paul Gosselaar and Soleil Moon Frye.

== Premise ==
The film focuses on the basketball team of an Episcopalian all-girl high school, where they try to make a name, despite only a little funding. The team's new female coach soon realizes she will have to work very hard if she wants the team to become a success.

== Cast ==
- Mark-Paul Gosselaar as Carl
- Soleil Moon Frye as Julia
- Jamie Luner as Lootie
- Jeffrey Meek as Father Thomas Mullberry
- Julie McCullough as Kimberly
- Steve Allen as Julia's grandfather

== Production ==
Frye occasionally showed up late on set while filming this movie and repeatedly got into arguments with her co-stars. Frye spent most nights at a local bar in Shreveport, Louisiana where the film was shot drinking and causing trouble that her private security had to get her out of. This out of control behavior was witnessed by many and recorded by security. Her personal security was also head of security at the bar her and the other stars visited almost nightly and off duty law enforcement and he has just recently stated she was the most difficult client he has ever protected and still has documentation to prove it.

== See also ==
- List of basketball films
