= Rags to Riches (TV series) =

American comedy-drama musical television series (1987–1988)

- Genre: Musical; Comedy drama
- Created by: Bernie Kukoff
- Starring: Joseph Bologna; Tisha Campbell; Blanca De Garr; Kimiko Gelman; Bridget Michele; Heidi Zeigler; Douglas Seale
- Opening theme: Mark Mueller (lyrics)
- Composer: J. Peter Robinson (1.1)
- Country of origin: United States
- Original language: English
- No. of seasons: 2
- No. of episodes: 20

Production
- Executive producers: Bernie Kukoff; Leonard Hill; Andrew Schneider
- Cinematography: Paul Onorato
- Camera setup: Single-camera
- Running time: 48 minutes
- Production companies: Leonard Hill Films; New World Television

Original release
- Network: NBC
- Release: March 9, 1987 – January 15, 1988

Rags to Riches is an American musical comedy drama that was broadcast on NBC for two seasons from March 9, 1987, to January 15, 1988. Set in the pre-British Invasion 1960s, the series tells the story of Nick Foley, a self-made millionaire who adopts six orphan girls. Each episode included musical scenes of hit songs from the era performed by the girls integrated into the plot (with the lyrics modified to provide commentary on the storyline).

== Plot ==
Nick Foley (Joseph Bologna), the millionaire owner of Foley Foods, is a streetwise New Jersey-born businessman who realizes that his playboy lifestyle has been a liability for his business reputation. In the TV movie pilot that launched the series, Foley attempts to develop a family man image by bringing a group of six orphaned girls, who were featured in a newspaper story saying that they refused to be separated from each other, to live in the mansion in Bel Air where he lives with his butler, John Clapper (Douglas Seale). Foley does this to seal a business deal and does not intend to keep the girls permanently, but Foley's plans change as he grows attached to the girls, and he ends up adopting them as his legal daughters.

The adjustment is huge on both sides, as the girls acquire a new father with no parenting experience. Having spent the past few years in a rundown orphanage, the girls suddenly find themselves in a life of luxury (hence the series' title). The series follows the trials and tribulations of the girls and a man who has previously never loved anyone but himself, and often struggles to cope with his new family.

In the pilot for the series, Foley takes in a group of six girls; however, Foley only adopted five of them for the remainder of the series' run: Rose, 17; Diane, 16; Marva, 15; Patty, 14; and Mickey, 8. The sixth girl, Nina, appears only in the pilot (after the pilot was produced, it was decided that six children was too many for the series cast, so Nina was written out of the series as having been reunited with her birth mother as referenced in the episode "Patty's Mom").

The series differed from regular comedy dramas in that the girls would frequently burst into song to help explain their feelings or move along the plot. Each episode therefore contained at least two musical scenes with covers of popular songs from the early 1960s with the lyrics changed to provide commentary on the storyline of the episode.

== Reception ==
Promoted with the tagline, "If you liked Annie, you'll like Rags to Riches". After very good ratings on Sunday night, it got moved to Friday in the fall of 1987 to make way for Family Ties. Ratings for the series were not strong enough for its Friday night time slot, and NBC canceled the show part way through its second season.

== Musical numbers ==
Mark Mueller wrote new lyrics for existing hit songs from the '50s and early '60s that were featured in most episodes of both seasons of the show. He also wrote the lyrics to the show's theme song. Many of the songs used were not around yet during the time frame when the series takes place; 1961-63.

== Cast and characters ==
=== Main cast ===
- Joseph Bologna as Nick Foley
- Tisha Campbell as Marva
- Blanca De Garr as Patty
- Kimiko Gelman as Rose
- Bridget Michele as Diane
- Heidi Zeigler as Mickey
- Douglas Seale as John Clapper

=== Recurring cast ===
- Heather McAdam as Nina
- Sarah Buxton as Amy Hillerman
- Sue Ball as Marnie
- Jeff Harlan as Marty
- John Christy Ewing as Mr. Donovan
- Sandy Ward as Al Schweikert

== Episodes ==
Season	Episodes	Originally released	
Season	Episodes	First released	Last released
1	8	March 9, 1987	April 26, 1987
2	13	September 18, 1987	January 15, 1988

=== Season 1 (1987) ===
No. overall	No. in season	Title	Directed by	Written by	Original release date
1	1	"Pilot"	Bruce Seth Green	Bernie Kukoff	March 9, 1987
In 1961, Nick Foley, a successful millionaire of food products, adopts six girls in order to secure a company merger and shed his playboy bachelor image. With help from his fun-loving butler John Clapper, Nick gets into more trouble raising the girls than he can handle. Patty has difficulty reading and Nina runs off with her boyfriend who is part of a motorcycle gang.
2	2	"High Society"	Bruce Seth Green	Bernie Kukoff & Bill Daley	March 15, 1987
Nick enters Rose to participate in a debutante ball, much to her chagrin. Rose then falls for Matthew Taylor (Grant Cramer), a rich kid who is only dating her for a one-time sexual fling.
3	3	"Foley vs. Foley"	Michael Lange	David Garber & Bruce E. Kalish	March 22, 1987
The girls win a talent show at their favorite malt shop. However, when Rose goes to claim the trophy, she spies the owner Spiro (Jack Kruschen) being hectored by Miles Parnell (Richard Herd), a greedy land developer into selling his property. Spiro refuses to do so in that he is a Greek immigrant and this place represents making his mark in America. Nick encourages the girls to stand up for their beliefs and they stage a protest against this. However, Parnell turns out to be Nick's business partner, and the malt shop is being demolished to build an office building which has been a dream of Nick's for years. This was one of the few episodes where the girls' singing was part of the main script and not the fourth wall.
4	4	"First Love"	Bruce Seth Green	Andrew Schneider	March 29, 1987
Nick is worried about Diane's blossoming relationship with Duke (Sasha Mitchell), an older student fearing that it will become sexual. Nick falls for Jessica Lynn (Mel Harris), a beautiful socialite.
5	5	"Business Is Business"	Mike Switzer	Diane Frolov	April 5, 1987
Marva has plans to buy a food truck from Skip (Ken Osmond) and Rusty (Fabian), two men leaving the sandwich making business. Marva seems to be getting mixed messages from Nick, who has encouraged the girls to find their own path but has his misgivings about Marva entering the business world, relating his own early failures and struggles to get where he is today. Nick competes with Al Schweikert (Sandy Ward), an easily aggravated businessman, in buying a hotel. Things come to a head when Marva feels in over her head and seeks an illegal way out, when she is stopped by Nick, which leads to Marva admitting he was the closest thing to a dad after the loss of her true parents.
6	6	"Patty's Mom"	Chuck Braverman	Steven Baum & Neil Alan Levy	April 12, 1987
Patty believes that a random woman that she has spotted in the street is her biological mother. It turns out the woman is her mother, a wacky prop comedienne named Gloria Lang (Gina Hecht), who has no parenting skills.
7	7	"Bad Blood"	Michael Lange	Steve Johnson & Sharon Spelman	April 19, 1987
Nick's brother Frankie (Joe Cortese) unexpectedly shows up, re-opening unresolved issues between the two men. Taking advice from Frankie, Patty gets even with a bully.
8	8	"Born to Ride"	Bruce Seth Green	Andrew Schneider & Bernie Kukoff	April 26, 1987
A newly-licensed Diane gets into a car accident, but is actually set up by Arnie (David Paymer), a petty criminal who is out to collect insurance money. Nick has the girls star in a TV commercial for his newest breakfast cereal.

=== Season 2 (1987–88) ===
No. overall	No. in season	Title	Directed by	Written by	Original release date
9	1	"Vegas Rock"	Michael Switzer	Andrew Schneider	September 18, 1987
10	2	"Vegas Rock"	Michael Switzer	Andrew Schneider	September 18, 1987
The girls travel to Las Vegas to obtain an autographed guitar signed by Elvis Presley for a charity. Nick also travels to Las Vegas collaborating with the FBI to entrap Michael Rapp (Alex Rocco), a shady businessman. Clapper falls for Ruby (Priscilla Pointer), a fellow Vegas vacationer.
11	3	"Once in a Lifeguard"	Bruce Seth Green	Chris Carter	September 25, 1987
Rose wants to become a lifeguard, but must deal with her sexist employer to prove herself. Patty changes out of her tomboy look, to get the attention of Sean Howland (Ken Olandt), a handsome lifeguard.
12	4	"That's Cheating"	Kim Friedman	Story by : Molly-Ann Leikin; Teleplay by : Molly-Ann Leikin and Harry Longstreet & Renee Longstreet	October 2, 1987
Rose is struggling in Mr. Mazza's (Graham Jarvis) chemistry class, and is tempted by Arnold (Rob Stone) to cheat on a big exam. Nick competes to win a major award while also donating to a struggling hospital and is butting heads with a dedicated doctor Stanley Strumlan (Oliver Clark). Mickey goes overboard selling Girl Scout cookies, with Diane giving in to eating them despite trying to keep her slim figure.
13	5	"Wilderness Blues"	Michael Switzer	Story by : Deborah Baron; Teleplay by : Deborah Baron & Andrew Schneider	October 16, 1987
Nick feels that he and the girls don't spend enough time together, so he forces them to join him on a weekend getaway in the woods. Marva, however, would rather spend time with her college boyfriend. Patty is remaking the film Psycho for a video school project.
14	6	"Dear Diary"	Daniel Cahn	Robin Schiff	October 23, 1987
Phil Johnson (Dick Van Patten), a fellow businessman friend of Nick's, leads a campaign to have the girl's English teacher Ms. Newman (Robin Curtis) fired for her unorthodox teaching methods. As a result, Marva and Rose use the school newspaper to fight for Ms. Newman and protect their first amendment rights. Patty is having difficulty with writing in her English class, so Ms. Newman gives her a blank diary, so she can go wild her imagination. With help from Diane, Clapper takes part in series of radio trivia contests.
15	7	"Hunk in the House"	Bruce Green	Harry Longstreet & Renee Longstreet	November 6, 1987
Billy Gallento (Richard Grieco), Nick's godson of an old World War II buddy, stays over at the Foley mansion, having most of the girls swoon over him. Diane just coming off a difficult breakup, falls for Billy the most and uses Rose's advice to impress him, while Rose is also interested in being with Billy. Mickey is given a school assignment to look for safety hazards around the mansion.
16	8	"Marva in the Key of Cee"	Michael Switzer	Susan Goldberg	November 13, 1987
Celia Smith (Margaret Avery), Rose's new piano teacher was once a famous singer. Marva then discovers this, and tries set up a comeback for Celia without her permission. Ernie (Aeryk Eagan), an old friend of Mickey's from the orphanage, sneaks over to the mansion and plans on running away to Mexico.
17	9	"Beauty and the Babe"	Bruce Seth Green	Chris Carter	November 20, 1987
Diane enters a beauty pageant, which interferes with her studies. Brady Ladean (Peter Barton), a popstar and one of the judges of the pageant makes the moves on Diane. Nick begins dating television star Babe Adair (Shannon Tweed), who has a long list of ex-lovers. Mickey becomes obsessed with unicorns, after spotting a non-sellable unicorn glass statue at a store.
18	10	"A Russian Holiday"	Charles Correll	Andrew Schneider	December 11, 1987
Viktor Leskov (Joseph Mascolo), a Russian diplomat and his son Alex (Jay Pickett) visit America to form a business deal with Nick. Rose takes a liking to Alex and shows him a good time, sneaking away from security. Mickey tries to soften up one of Leskov's security guards.
19	11	"A Very Foley Christmas"	Daniel Cahn	Story by : Susan Goldberg & Robin Schiff; Teleplay by : Andrew Schneider and Harry Longstreet & Renee Longstreet	December 20, 1987
Louise McMillan (K Callan), a stern social worker, visits the Foleys on Christmas Eve, and the girls look back on memories since being adopted by Nick. Meanwhile, Nick's car breaks down on a far away road and seeks help from Eli Tuttle (Robert Donner), a curmudgeon car mechanic.
20	12	"Guess Who's Coming to Slumber?"	Michael Lange	Robin Schiff	January 8, 1988
Marva runs for class president and decides to throw a slumber party to impress the female student body, while Nick is away and Clapper is sick with the flu. The party soon gets out of control when rowdy students show up. Nick gets Patty a job at a horse stable, and she steals a racehorse who can no longer run.
21	13	"Sweet 16"	James Kellahin	Steven Baum & Neil Alan Levy	January 15, 1988
Diane agrees to have a late Sweet Sixteen birthday party, until the Cuban Missile Crisis ruins the plans. Fearing the worst in relation to the crisis, Nick installs a fallout shelter.

== Home media ==
On June 5, 2012, Image Entertainment released Rags to Riches: The Complete Series on Region 1 DVD.

DTP Entertainment released the entire series on DVD in Germany. Season 1 was released on May 13, 2011, and season 2 on October 27, 2011.

== Awards and nominations ==
Year	Award	Category	Recipient	Result
1988	Young Artist Award	Best Young Actress Under Ten Years of Age in Television or Motion Pictures	Heidi Zeigler	Won
1988	Young Artist Award	Best Family Comedy Series	–	Nominated
1988	Young Artist Award	Exceptional Performance by a Young Actress in a Television Comedy Series	Blanca De Garr	Nominated
