= Home (2016 American film) =

2015 film by Frank Lin

- Film poster
- Directed by: Frank Lin
- Screenplay by: Frank Lin; Jeff Lam
- Produced by: Jeff Lam; Brian Roberts; Jason Inouye
- Starring: Heather Langenkamp; Samantha Mumba; Kerry Knuppe; Aaron Hill; Alessandra Shelby Farmer; Lew Temple
- Cinematography: Jason Inouye
- Edited by: Dayne Tanioka
- Music by: Christopher Wong
- Production company: Shoreline Entertainment
- Distributed by: Inception Group Media
- Release date: March 1, 2016
- Running time: 87 minutes
- Country: United States
- Language: English

Home is a 2016 American horror drama film directed by Frank Lin, starring Heather Langenkamp and Samantha Mumba.

== Plot ==
A religious young woman (Carrie) has difficulty coping when her mother decides to come out as a lesbian and marry an atheist woman. After her parents leave on a business trip, she discovers that their house is haunted by evil and must save herself and her little stepsister (Tia).

== Cast ==
- Heather Langenkamp as Heather
- Samantha Mumba as Samantha
- Kerry Knuppe as Carrie
- Aaron Hill as Aaron
- Alessandra Shelby Farmer as Tia
- Lew Temple as Lew

== Release ==
Home was released as VOD and DVD in Region 1 by Inception Group Media on March 1, 2016.
