= Welcome to 18 =

- VHS cover
- Directed by: Terry Carr
- Screenplay by: Terry Carr; Judith Sherman Wolin
- Produced by: David C. Thomas
- Starring: Mariska Hargitay; Courtney Thorne-Smith; JoAnn Willette; Cristen Kauffman
- Cinematography: Stephen L. Posey
- Edited by: Lois Freeman-Fox
- Music by: Tony Berg
- Production company: Green Griffin
- Distributed by: American Distribution Group; International Video Entertainment; Green Griffin
- Release date: November 14, 1986
- Running time: 91 minutes
- Country: United States
- Language: English

Welcome to 18 (alternative title: Summer Release) is a 1986 American coming of age comedy-drama film directed by Terry Carr, who also wrote the screenplay with Judith Sherman Wolin. It stars Mariska Hargitay, Courtney Thorne-Smith and JoAnn Willette.

== Plot ==
The film follows the adventures of three high school girls the summer after they graduate. After their jobs at a dude ranch fail to work out, the girls head to Lake Tahoe where they meet Talia (Cristen Kauffman). Talia's boyfriend Roscoe then helps the girls get a job at a casino which leads to trouble.

== Cast ==
- Mariska Hargitay as Joey
- Courtney Thorne-Smith as Lindsey
- JoAnn Willette as Robin
- Cristen Kauffman as Talia
- E. Erich Anderson as Roscoe
- Graham Ludlow as Pipes
