= Philip Solomon =

American psychiatrist and researcher

Dr. Philip Solomon (April 16, 1907 – May 31, 2002) was an American psychiatrist and researcher.

== Life and work ==
A Phi Beta Kappa graduate of Harvard College (1927) and Harvard Medical School, Solomon served as a Commander in the U.S. Navy attached to the sixth Marine division during World War II as the Division Psychiatrist. He was Clinical Professor of Psychiatry at Harvard Medical School and Physician in Chief of Psychiatry at Boston City Hospital from 1952 until 1969. He founded the College Mental Health Center in Boston in 1968. In 1969, Solomon moved to La Jolla, California where he served as Clinical Professor of Psychiatry at the UCSD Medical School.

His fields of research included electroencephalography, sensory deprivation, alcoholism, suicide and other clinical subjects. His publications number over 200, including several books.

Married three times with three children, Dr. Solomon was preceded in death by his first wife, Sarah "Pebbles" Gelman Solomon (of Hartford, Boston, Los Angeles and Houston), his second wife U.S. Senator Maurine Brown Neuberger and survived by his third ex-wife, Dr. Susan Thurman Kleeman of Boston; son, fine art photographer Andrew L. Solomon, and Andrew's wife, Dana Donsky Solomon, Esq, of Houston; two daughters, music and popular culture critic Linda Solomon of Houston and Susan Thurman Solomon of Boston; stepson, Jeffrey Thurman Kleeman of Los Angeles; grandsons, Rex Solomon, and Rex's wife Margaret Ann Solomon, Esq, and great grandson Dylan Chase Solomon, of Houston, and cinematographer Keith Solomon and his wife, and two great granddaughters of Los Angeles. He was brother in to artist Aaron Gelman. He was buried in Temple Israel Cemetery in Wakefield, Massachusetts.

== National positions ==
- Consultant, U.S. Nuclear Regulatory Commission, Washington. D.C.
- Chairman of the American Psychiatric Association Committee on Psychiatry and Medical Practice
- The second man to be a living spouse of a serving United States Senator, and the first to marry a sitting Senator.

== Bibliography ==
- Sensory Deprivation: A Symposium (1961) (editor) OCLC 538525
- Recent Research on Schizophrenia (1964) (editor with Bernard C. Glueck, Jr., M.D.) Library of Congress Catalog Card No 64-66258
- Psychiatric Drugs (1966) (editor) Library of Congress Catalog Card No 66-11898
- The Psychiatric Consultation (1968) (editor with Werner M. Mendel) OCLC 643469
- Handbook of Psychiatry (1974) ISBN 0-87041-164-0
