= List of Just the Ten of Us episodes =

This article is a list of episodes from the television series Just the Ten of Us.

== Series overview ==
Season	Episodes	Originally released	
Season	Episodes	First released	Last released
1	4	April 26, 1988	May 17, 1988
2	20	October 28, 1988	April 28, 1989
3	23	September 13, 1989	May 4, 1990

Broadcast History

- April 1988 – May 1988, ABC Tuesday 8:30–9:00
- September 1988 – June 1989, ABC Friday 9:30–10:00
- July 1989, ABC Wednesday 8:30–9:00
- August 1989 – July 1990, ABC Friday 9:30–10:00

== Episodes ==
=== Season 1 (1988) ===
No. overall	No. in season	Title	Directed by	Written by	Original release date	Rating/share (households)
1	1	"Move It or Lose It"	John Tracy	Steve Marshall & Dan Guntzelman	April 26, 1988	20.2/32
The Lubbock family moves to Eureka, California, where Graham has accepted a coaching job at St. Augustine Academy. The Coach learns that "St. Augie's" is an all-boys school, which his daughters will also be attending. The family arrives at their new run-down home. Graham learns he got the job because his former student, Duane Johnson, works on the faculty, and has been corresponding with Elizabeth.
2	2	"First Day at School"	John Tracy	David Kendall & Tim O'Donnell	May 3, 1988	18.0/29
The first day of school is a culture shock for everyone, particularly the girls, who are fawned after by the entire student-body. But the young men soon back away from the girls when J.R. tries to impress two guys by revealing that Coach Lubbock killed a kid in New York "just to watch him die."
3	3	"The Birthday Gift"	John Tracy	Tom Walla	May 10, 1988	17.2/29
For his birthday, Graham receives an unsigned brown-paper-wrapped shoebox containing $1,233, but he is reluctant to keep it. He suspects that it came from friends who wanted to help with the moving expenses; the truth was that Cindy had raffled herself off for a date with the young men of St. Augie's.
4	4	"Close Encounters"	John Tracy	Kate Boutilier	May 17, 1988	16.1/27
While the Coach is away, the girls will play! Graham and Elizabeth go on a camping trip, leaving eldest daughter Marie in charge. Cindy and Wendy soon invite a bunch of guys over.

=== Season 2 (1988–89) ===
No. overall	No. in season	Title	Directed by	Written by	Original release date	Viewers (millions)
5	1	"Strangers in the Night"	Dan Guntzelman	Kevin Abbott	October 28, 1988	18.4
Graham intercepts a note that's being passed around the class, which boasts about a guy having been out with "the hottest Lubbock babe" the previous night. Of course, the hot-tempered Coach becomes upset, particularly when he learns that three of his daughters were out on dates the night before.
6	2	"She Works Hard for the Money"	Frank Bonner	Dan Guntzelman & Steve Marshall	November 4, 1988	18.4
The four teenage girls each get jobs to help bring in some extra cash. Connie ends up in a slaughterhouse; Marie becomes a volunteer; Cindy gets exploited for her beauty to be a receptionist at a fitness centre; and Wendy is too distracted by shopping to look for work.
7	3	"Voice of God"	Nancy Heydorn (orig. listed as Frank Bonner)	Dan Guntzelman & Steve Marshall	November 11, 1988	16.7
Elizabeth becomes convinced that she was having a conversation with God. Nobody believes her until a tree crashes through her bedroom window—where Graham would have been had she not forced him and the kids to have early-morning prayers outside with her.
8	4	"The Dinner Test"	Howard Storm	Rich Reinhart	November 18, 1988	18.9
After letting it slip that she's going out with a guy named Bill, Wendy cruises the library and gets a guy named Ed (played by Matthew Perry) to "play Bill", so he can pass Graham's "Dinner Test" – where Graham questions the boy to see if he's worthy of taking out his daughter.
9	5	"Coach's Court"	Howard Storm	Kevin Abbott	November 25, 1988	16.7
When Graham falls through the already-broken porch railing, he conducts "a family trial" to find out who broke it.
10	6	"The Merry Mix-up"	Anson Williams	Tim O'Donnell	December 2, 1988	17.4
Wendy steals Elizabeth's ID, and Cindy steals Marie's, so that the underage duo can sneak into an exclusive dance club. The bouncer has problems believing that Wendy is in her 40s, so only Cindy gets in. Meanwhile, Marie finds herself tutoring—and falling for—Father Hargis's nephew Damien whom Coach has never met. Then Cindy's date from the club shows up asking for "Marie."
11	7	"The Unkindest Cut of All"	Frank Bonner	Rich Reinhart	December 9, 1988	16.4
Graham tries to keep it a secret that he's going into the hospital for hemorrhoid surgery. But when the girls get wind of his hospital stay, they assume he's dying—and they spread the news of his failing health to everyone at St. Augie's.
12	8	"A Christmas Story"	Bob Heath	Rich Reinhart	December 16, 1988	17.3
Graham's plans to buy Elizabeth an organ change when the transmission goes out on the family station wagon. Frustrated, Graham decides to sell the car for "organ money," unaware that the girls have raised the money on their own to fix the transmission.
13	9	"Personal Best"	John Guntzelman	Rich Reinhart	January 6, 1989	24.0
The girls are finally allowed to take gym class—-much to their dismay. When Graham realizes that Wendy can run fast, he talks her into joining the track team—-much to J.R.'s dismay.
14	10	"Song of Constance"	Jonathan Weiss	Kevin Abbott	January 13, 1989	21.8
Connie gets the opportunity to write for the school's literary journal, then gets writer's block. When she gets published, Father Hargis has it recalled because he thinks it's "pornography".
15	11	"Head of the Class"	Frank Bonner	Kate Boutilier	January 20, 1989	20.5
On "report-card day," Graham convinces Wendy that she tested in the genius range on IQ tests to increase her learning potential. When Sherry overhears this, she breaks into the school records and discovers that she herself is not the genius she was always told she was.
16	12	"Dream Girls"	Mike Sullivan	Rich Reinhart	February 3, 1989	21.2
The girls record their version of "Rock Around the Clock" just for fun. Graham tells them they could never make a living singing, but they end up headlining at a local pizzeria.
17	13	"A Day in the Life"	Frank Bonner	Kevin Abbott	February 10, 1989	19.8
When Wendy gets suspended from school for cutting classes, her punishment is to take over Elizabeth's homemaker duties for a day. Wendy thinks she can do everything in 1 day and have 2 days to "relax." Then she undergoes an exhausting day of chores, including a search for little Harvey when he wanders off—which teaches her something about cutting classes.
18	14	"Zorro en el Gallinero"	Jonathan Weiss	Kate Boutilier & Colin McKay	February 17, 1989	21.7
The Coach lets a (supposedly) non-English-speaking foreign exchange student stay in their home. But after the lights go out, all of the teenage girls — including Marie — sneak into his bedroom and throw themselves at him.
19	15	"Car in the Pool"	John Guntzelman	Tom Walla	February 24, 1989	20.4
While her sisters are yapping in her ear, Marie accidentally taps Father Hargis's car and sends it rolling into the campus pool. But when Father Hargis finds his car underwater, nobody wants to confess.
20	16	"The Critic"	John Guntzelman	Rachelle Romberg	March 10, 1989	16.9
Connie gets the opportunity to write a review of the school's stage production of "Death of a Salesman," starring Gavin Doosler and Cindy, for the newspaper. After gritting her teeth through the awful performance, she writes two reviews—a nice one and a scathing one. Guess which one gets used?
21	17	"The Good, the Bad, and the Ugly"	James Widdoes	Rich Reinhart	March 17, 1989	19.8
Marie meets Russell at a dance and is interested in him. When her sisters complain that he's "too much of a nerd," she cools toward him—until a heart-to-heart talk with Elizabeth encourages her to give him a chance.
22	18	"Radio Days"	Bob Heath	Kate Boutilier	March 31, 1989	18.6
Cindy decides to try for the open spot on the campus radio station. Nobody thinks she can get it, and Graham intends to use his influence, but he "just misses" Father Budd. Cindy gets the job on her own merit, then hears that her father was supposed to "get her the job." Can she prove herself to the St. Augie's audience—and to herself?
23	19	"Puberty Blues"	Jim Johnston	Rich Reinhart	April 14, 1989	19.9
After failing to scare his sisters with his monster makeup, J.R. inadvertently impresses a Girl Scout, who accidentally breaks all of her cookies. J.R. is smitten, so he decides to ask the girl out—with advice from his own sisters.
24	20	"Rock n' Roll Fantasy"	Mike Sullivan	Dan Guntzelman	April 28, 1989	18.8
After 8 weeks of performing at Danny's, the "Lubbock Babes" each fantasize about being rich and famous. Marie dreams of singing for the Pope; Wendy dreams of working on a sitcom; Cindy dreams of finding her ideal man and starting a family; and Connie dreams of singing in Paris.

=== Season 3 (1989–90) ===
No. overall	No. in season	Title	Directed by	Written by	Original release date	Viewers (millions)
25	1	"Betrayal"	Jonathan Weiss	Bob Burris & Michael Ware	September 13, 1989	19.3
Wendy and Cindy go out on a double date. But Cindy's date, Cort, is more interested in Wendy. Cort breaks a date to go to an Oingo Boingo concert with Cindy, and takes Wendy instead. Marie realizes what's going on, so she coaxes Cindy into giving Wendy a taste of her own medicine—by going out with Wendy's boyfriend, Blitz.
26	2	"Quarterback Sneak"	Jonathan Weiss	Michael Ware & Bob Burris	September 29, 1989	20.2
Just days before a big football game, Wendy begins dating the star quarterback (played by Matt LeBlanc) – which makes him "lose his mind".
27	3	"Who Cut the Cheese?"	Frank Bonner	Nick LeRose	October 6, 1989	20.7
When the family is offered free food from the government, Graham doesn't want to accept charity. So, unbeknownst to everyone but Connie, Graham takes a job working at Burger Barn--under supervisor Gavin Doosler.
28	4	"Risky Business"	James Widdoes	Rich Reinhart	October 13, 1989	18.6
Scuffling in the closet under the staircase, J.R. and Sherry break Elizabeth's best china. To replace it, they raise the prices of the candy they're supposed to be selling for school.
29	5	"Simple Gifts"	Mike Sullivan	Nick LeRose	October 20, 1989	22.1
Elizabeth takes on the task of leading the St. Augie's choir. She forces her girls to audition, but Cindy, Wendy and Connie do their best to sabotage their chances of making the choir.
30	6	"A Couple of Swells"	Jonathan Weiss	Jake & Mike Weinberger	November 3, 1989	19.3
Graham and Cindy decide to go on a diet together—and Elizabeth makes sure they both stick to it.
31	7	"That Championship Season"	Jonathan Weiss	Bob Burris & Michael Ware	November 10, 1989	18.5
Murphy, the quarterback for the championship game, fails a history test because he won't do the work. Others in the school encourage the coach to ignore the situation. In the end, Coach has to decide which is more important: winning, or his self-respect.
32	8	"Dangerous Liaison"	James Widdoes	Jake & Mike Weinberger	November 17, 1989	16.9
After a show, a tall, dark and-handsome stranger buys Wendy a beer, and the two go for a joyride—which ends with the guy robbing a convenience store. The surveillance tape shows that Wendy didn't have anything to do with the actual robbery, but she doesn't understand why her actions were wrong. So Graham and Elizabeth spend the entire night trying to get through to Wendy that she made bad decisions that had an effect on the outcome of the evening. All the while, Wendy contends that she's innocent.
33	9	"St. Augie's Blues: Part 1"	James Widdoes	Nick LeRose	November 24, 1989	19.4
The teachers of St. Augie's want a raise. Father Hargis fights, but in the end, he agrees. In order to do so, he has to raise tuition. When Connie writes the story for the newspaper, the parents' reaction leads to disastrous consequences.
34	10	"St. Augie's Blues: Part 2"	James Widdoes	Nick LeRose	December 1, 1989	19.5
Connie tries to make up for the havoc she has caused, but only makes things worse for her dad. Father Hargis tries to broker a truce between parents and teachers, but it takes an apology from Connie to fix the situation.
35	11	"Skateboard"	Frank Bonner	Jake & Mike Weinberger	December 8, 1989	21.1
J.R. works together with Graham to make his own skateboard, but his friends make him feel embarrassed about it.
36	12	"Highway to Heaven"	John Gunselman	Rich Reinhart	December 15, 1989	18.7
Marie and Elizabeth travel to a convent for a two-week trial, but on the way, Elizabeth begins to suspect that Marie is only doing it to please her.
37	13	"Comedy Tonight"	Mike Sullivan	Dan Guntzelman, Mike Sullivan & Bill Kirchenbauer	January 5, 1990	20.4
St. Augie's holds a variety show, and the Lubbock clan participates. The "Lubbock Babes" do their usual performance, J.R. and Sherry do a magic show, and Graham does a comedy routine—despite his stage fright.
38	14	"Poetic Justice"	Jonathan Weiss	Craig Shoemaker	January 12, 1990	20.9
Connie gets a crush on her poetry teacher, so she's ecstatic when he invites her to a poetry festival—-as the babysitter, unbeknownst to her.
39	15	"Perfect Date"	John Gunselman	Bob Burris & Michael Ware	January 19, 1990	22.3
Graham sets Wendy up on a date with a scout leader. Wendy retaliates by trying to unleash the "animal inside of him."
40	16	"Snow Job: Part 1"	John Gunselman	Michael Ware & Bob Burris	February 2, 1990	22.8
Gavin Doosler is depressed that he can't go on the annual ski trip—instead he'll be spending his school break at his parents' beach-house in the Virgin Islands. The girls want to go to comfort him—too bad his parents say that 3 of them "are too sleazy to hang out with." But since his parents love Marie, Wendy tells him that Marie has a crush on him. Marie, who was excited about the ski trip, is told that Gavin is dying. So the girls head off in their winter attire (except Cindy, who foolishly leaves the house in her beach clothes), and they and Gavin are off on a private plane to the Caribbean. Things are going well at first, until the clueless Sister Ethel reveals that the girls never arrived.
41	17	"Snow Job: Part 2"	John Gunselman	Michael Ware & Bob Burris	February 9, 1990	20.0
To recap, the girls sneaked off to the Virgin Islands with Gavin Doosler instead of going on the annual ski trip. Marie was told that Gavin was dying, and Gavin was told that Marie had a crush on him. So when the two realize that neither has the same intentions for their trip, they decide to pay back the three deceitful sisters by pretending to be in love. Back at home, Graham and Elizabeth freak out after Sister Ethel tells them that the girls never arrived.
42	18	"False Impressions"	Robert Heath	Michael Ware & Bob Burris	February 16, 1990	21.0
Connie ends up wearing a costume to the "Medieval Ball" that enhances her cleavage. When she gets asked out on a date, she ponders if the guy wants to date her—or if he only liked her for her padding.
43	19	"Cindy Breaks a Date"	James Widdoes	Jake & Mike Weinberger	February 23, 1990	20.1
Cindy resists the advances of a guy she's dating—by breaking his arm.
44	20	"Ratboy Lives"	Frank Bonner	Nick Lerose	March 16, 1990	18.4
J.R., feeling that he's being overshadowed by his sisters, tries to make his mark by spray painting "Ratboy Lives" on the side of the school gym.
45	21	"Heartbreaker"	John Gunselman	Michael Ware & Bob Burris	March 30, 1990	19.5
When a patron at Danny's drops dead at Marie's feet during her solo, she blames herself for killing him. Then she learns that he left her all his worldly possessions, although she didn't know him. Marie becomes confused and wonders if her purpose in life is "to please men."
46	22	"Smoke 'Em If You Got 'Em"	David Kendall	Rich Reinhart & Dan Guntzelman	April 27, 1990	19.4
When Graham finds a cigarette butt in the basement, he grills the family to find out who smoked it. #1 suspect: Wendy. Last one he'd ever suspect? Sherry.
47	23	"Slaughter House Ten"	Mike Sullivan	Bill Kirchenbauer & Brad Slaight	May 4, 1990	19.7
Graham and J.R. go to the store for groceries, and come back with a cow. When the girls learn that Graham only bought it to slaughter, they resort to drastic measures—getting the cow pregnant.
