= Mitchell Smith (author) =

- Born: 1935 (age 90–91); New York, U.S.
- Education: Columbia University
- Occupation: Author
- Writing career
- Genres: Crime fiction; science fiction

Mitchell Smith (born 1935) is an American author writing crime fiction and science fiction.

== Biography ==
Mitchell Smith was born in upper New York State, and went to military school on Mississippi's Gulf Coast. He attended Columbia University, where he studied English and history. He enlisted in the army working in military intelligence stationed in Berlin during the Cold War. After leaving the army, he started his career in writing. He currently lives in Whatcom County, Washington.

== Writing ==
Smith started his writing career with pulp Westerns, including several "erotic Westerns" (in the Buckskin imprint) published under the pen-name of Roy LeBeau, and then switching to crime novels. His novels include Daydreams (1987), which centers on a female detective investigating the murder of a call girl; Stone City (1990), a mystery set entirely in a maximum security prison, where an imprisoned professor is appointed by the inmates to solve a series of murders (remarkably similar to the HBO series Oz (1997) in its initial premise); Due North (1992), concerning a woman who returns to Seattle from the Alaskan wilderness to care for her dying mother; Karma (1994), a thriller featuring Hindu mobsters; Sacrifice (1997), a thriller in the vein of Floridian crime writers (Charles Willeford, John D. MacDonald and Carl Hiaasen); and Reprisal (1999), a tale of familial revenge and psychological horror which is celebrated in an essay by Michael Shea in Horror: Another 100 Best Books. Smith switched to science fiction with his latest books which form The Snowfall Trilogy consisting of Snowfall, Kingdom River, and Moonrise.

Smith's story "Popcorn" was adapted as a film of the same name.
