= Kimiko Gelman =

American actress

- Born: February 20, 1966 (age 60)
- Occupation: Actress
- Years active: 1987–present

Kimiko Gelman (born February 20, 1966) is an American actress.

Gelman is best known for starring in the television series Rags to Riches from 1987 to 1988, where she played the role of Rose. She has also made appearances on a number of other TV shows including CSI: Miami, Providence, The West Wing, Beverly Hills 90210 and Chicago Hope. She appeared in the movie The Hunger Games as Venia, a member of Katniss Everdeen's prep team. Gelman has also acted in various theater productions in the United States.

Kimiko is the granddaughter of the American artist Aaron Gelman.

== Filmography ==
Film and Television
Year	Title	Role	Notes
1987–1988	Rags to Riches	Rose Foley	20 episodes
1988	Knots Landing	Norma	Episode: "Sex and Violence"
1989	Freddy's Nightmares	Annie	Episode: "Deadline"
1990	Hunter	Billie	Episode: "Second Sight"
1990	Tour of Duty	Lieu	Episode: "Payback"
1990	Bagdad Cafe	Stephanie	Episode: "Sixteen Candles"
1991	Down Home		Episode: "Get Thee Back to a Nunnery"
1993	The Pickle	Patti Wong	
1994	A Passion to Kill	Beth's Secretary	
1995	Chicago Hope	Nurse Amy	Episode: "Every Day a Little Death"
1996	Mother	Saleswoman at Victoria's Secret	
1996	Beverly Hills, 90210	Tammy Ishida	Episode: "Fearless"
1996	Ned & Stacey	Kelly	Episode: "A Tender Trap"
1996	The Pretender	Dr. Kim Fugimora	Episode: "Not Even a Mouse"
1998	Billy's Hollywood Screen Kiss	Donna	
1998	The Simple Life	Beth Berg	Episode: "The Other Mother"
1998	David and Lisa	Molly	TV movie
2000	The West Wing	Secret Service Agent Agent Kelly	Episode: "Six Meetings Before Lunch"
2001	On the Edge	May Lee Ha	TV movie
2001	Providence	Eleanor White	Episode: "Big Night"; Episode: "You Can Count on Me"
2002	The Division		Episode: "A Priori"
2002	Minority Report	Mother on Metro (uncredited)	
2002	For the People	Judith	
2005	CSI: Miami	Dr. Nicole Talcott	4 episodes
2006	Zoey 101	Dr. Lang	Episode: "Quinn's Alpaca"
2011	Audrey & Dre	Shannon	
2012	The Hunger Games	Venia	
2013	Plush		Post-production
2013	The Hunger Games: Catching Fire	Venia	
2014	The Hunger Games: Mockingjay – Part 1	Venia	
2015	The Hunger Games: Mockingjay – Part 2	Venia	
2016	How to Get Away with Murder	Ursula	1 episode
2017-2019	13 Reasons Why	Vice-Principal Jane Childs	
2018	Magnum P.I.	Mari Sako	Episode: "The Ties That Bind"
2018	Madam Secretary	Rochana Arak	Episode: "Ghosts"
