= Dick Thies =

American actor (1937–1998)

Richard William Thies (May 14, 1937 – January 21, 1998) was an American actor known for playing villains in Western films during the 1960s. He was credited in his film and television appearances as Dick Thies.

== Biography ==
Richard William Thies was born in Reno, Nevada on May 14, 1937, as the son of Alfred and Melba Thies.

Thies was married to actress Kathleen Mitchell, though they later divorced in January 1983. and father of actress Brooke Theiss.

Dick Thies died on January 21, 1998, at the age of 60.

== Filmography ==
- Route 66 (1960–62) (TV), played Waldo
- The Talisman (1966), a.k.a. The Savage American, played Buford
