= Heather Langenkamp =

American actress and filmmaker (born 1964)

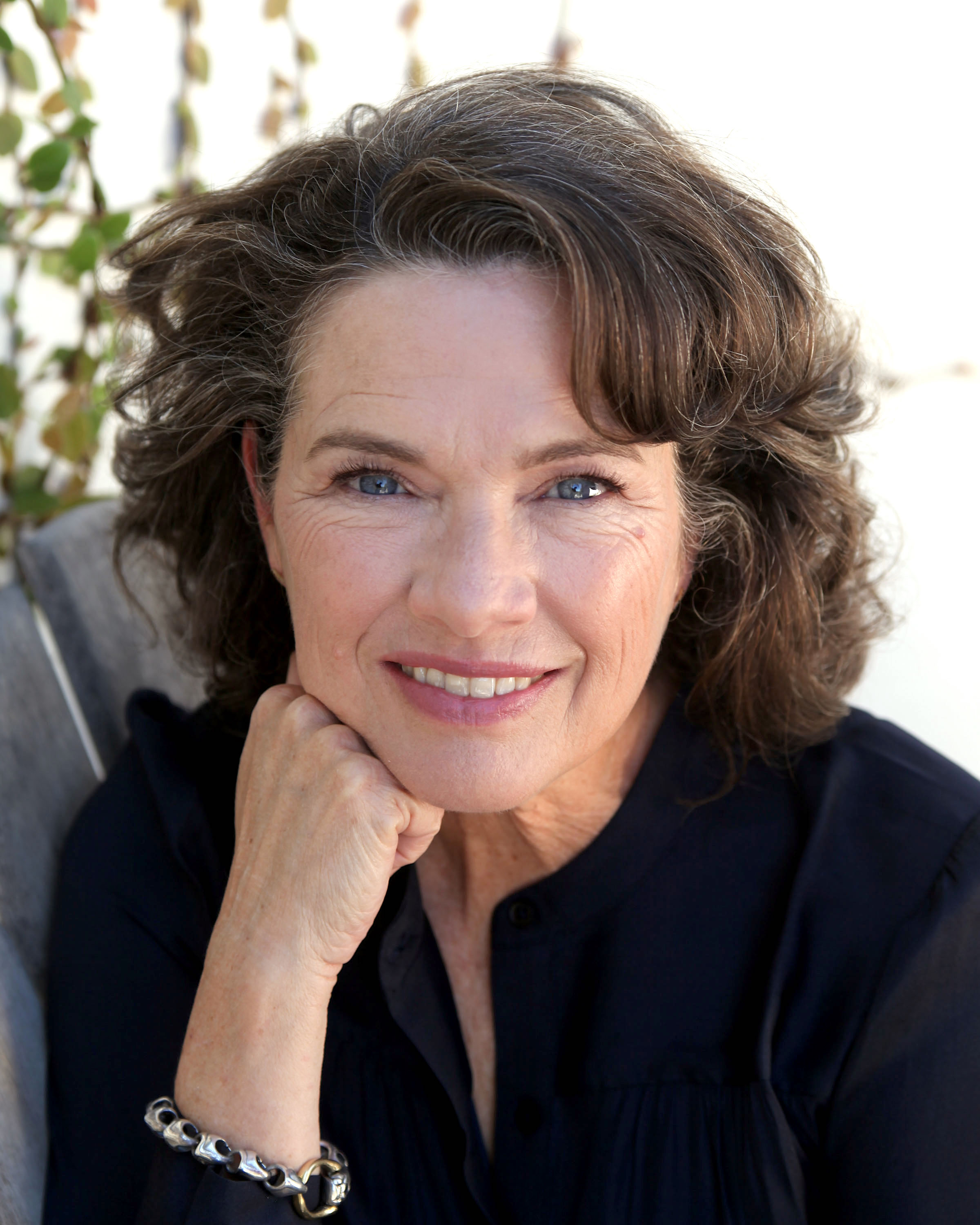
- Langenkamp in 2023
- Born: Heather Elizabeth Langenkamp; July 17, 1964 (age 62); Tulsa, Oklahoma, U.S.
- Other name: Heather Langenkamp Anderson
- Occupations: Actress; filmmaker; businesswoman; radio personality
- Years active: 1983–present
- Spouses: Alan Pasqua (m. 1984; div. 1987) David LeRoy Anderson (m. 1989)
- Children: 2

Heather Elizabeth Langenkamp (born July 17, 1964) is an American actress and businesswoman. Langenkamp is best known for portraying heroine Nancy Thompson in the A Nightmare on Elm Street films, a role which led to her being an influential figure in horror films.

Born and raised in Tulsa, Oklahoma, Langenkamp began acting professionally after being cast as an extra in Francis Ford Coppola‘s Tulsa-shot drama films The Outsiders (1983) and Rumble Fish (1983), the latter of which she had a line of dialogue which got her into the Screen Actors Guild. While her scenes were cut from both films, the experience motivated her to pursue an acting career.

Langenkamp appeared as the lead in the independent drama film Nickel Mountain (1984) before her breakthrough role as Nancy in Wes Craven's landmark slasher film A Nightmare on Elm Street (1984). Langenkamp reprised her role as Nancy in A Nightmare on Elm Street 3: Dream Warriors (1987) and portrayed a fictionalized version of herself in Wes Craven's New Nightmare (1994). In 2010, Langenkamp worked as the executive producer and narrator for the documentary film Never Sleep Again: The Elm Street Legacy, followed by another documentary, I Am Nancy (2011).

Langenkamp had guest appearances as two different characters on the ABC sitcom Growing Pains (1988–1990), for a total of five episodes. Langenkamp reprised one of her characters, Marie Lubbock, as a main cast member in the spin-off series Just the Ten of Us (1988–1990) for three seasons. Langenkamp took a hiatus from acting, but returned with the horror film The Butterfly Room (2012). She has since had roles in Star Trek Into Darkness (2013), the Netflix series The Midnight Club (2022), The Life of Chuck (2024), and Last Chance Motel (2026).

In addition to acting, Langenkamp co-runs the visual effects studio AFX Studio with her husband David LeRoy Anderson. She has worked as a special make-up effects coordinator for films such as Dawn of the Dead (2004), Cinderella Man (2005), Evan Almighty (2007), and The Cabin in the Woods (2012).

== Life and career ==
=== Early years ===
Heather Elizabeth Langenkamp was born in Tulsa, Oklahoma. Her mother, Mary Alice (née Myers), is an artist and an abstract expressionist painter. Her father, Robert Dobie Langenkamp, was a petroleum attorney and a Deputy Assistant Secretary of Energy. She later moved to Washington, D.C., where she attended the National Cathedral School for Girls, graduating in 1982. She then enrolled in Stanford University in 1982 and was a roommate of politician Susan Rice.

=== 1980s: A Nightmare on Elm Street franchise and Just the Ten of Us stardom ===
At age eighteen, Langenkamp worked for the Tulsa Tribune where she saw an advertisement looking for extras for Francis Ford Coppola's The Outsiders in the summer of 1982. Auditions occurred at a nearby elementary school where the casting director took a Polaroid of her; Langenkamp got a call back to appear in a high school scene, in which she had to wear attire based on 1950s fashion. Coppola was shooting another film in Tulsa the same summer, Rumble Fish, after The Outsiders; Langenkamp's friend got a phone call to appear in a street scene, and her friend's mother felt more comfortable with Langenkamp going with her to the set at night. The casting director allowed her to join and gave dialogue to Langenkamp—in which she did several takes of her saying dialogue to Matt Dillon's character; The Outsiders and Rumble Fish did not include her scenes but helped her get into the Screen Actors Guild. These positive experiences made Langenkamp feel like she should attempt to pursue an acting career in Hollywood. She took sporadic breaks from college to pursue it.

While studying at Stanford University, she would travel to Los Angeles on the weekends to pursue auditions, where she had her first official Hollywood audition for Drew Denbaum's independent drama film Nickel Mountain (1984). While auditioning, her rented car got hit by a runaway truck on Cahuenga Boulevard. Denbaum and the casting director helped Langenkamp during the ordeal. She bonded with them and got cast in the lead role of Callie Wells. She has expressed regret for doing the nude scene as she feared voicing her discomfort while filming—as she was an up-and-coming actress. Her next role was Beth, the daughter of Joanne Woodward and Richard Crenna's characters in the CBS television film Passions (1984). The direction towards her character received praise. Langenkamp reflects, "It was a complex part. Richard plays a philandering husband who has a son with his mistress, so my character was acting like a bridge between these two families."

I really felt like I was gonna just bring myself to the set, and be as close to me as I could. I didn't prepare in the classic sense. I didn't know that was part of the whole thing. I was not a very trained actor at all. I'd taken classes, of course, but I just tried to learn my lines and be on my mark and do those right things.

— Langenkamp on her preparation for portraying Nancy.

Langenkamp became aware of auditions for a horror film known as A Nightmare on Elm Street (1984) at the end of 1983. Casting director Annette Benson was familiar to Langenkamp as she had brought her in to read for the lead role in Night of the Comet (1984). She auditioned for the highly sought after role of fifteen-year-old heroine Nancy. There were not enough chairs to accommodate the number of actresses auditioning. Craven stated that he wanted someone very "non-Hollywood" and someone who embodied the "all-American, girl-next-door" for the role and believed that Langenkamp had these qualities. Craven informed her that she got the part in January 1984. The film grossed $25.5 million at the United States box-office and was a critical success upon release. Langenkamp returned to college because she enjoyed the campus atmosphere. She tried to keep a low profile by cutting her hair short and wearing glasses. Still, people recognized her in public. Langenkamp struggled with this recognition, as some peers tried to maintain close contact with her due to her sudden fame. In 2021, the Library of Congress inducted A Nightmare on Elm Street into the National Film Registry.

Despite the mainstream success of A Nightmare on Elm Street, Langenkamp later struggled with finding substantial film roles, reflecting in 1994: "It’s sad when your first job is so wonderful, and the rest of the way down the line you have to struggle to find that again." In 1985, Langenkamp portrayed Hope Sherman in the NBC television pilot Suburban Beat, the youngest of four housewives living in the fictitious Jericho Downs, who work together to solve crime. In a review for The New York Times, John Corry wrote, "Heather Langenkamp, as the youngest housewife, is particularly adorable, but since she's also amusing, the adorability isn't cloying." The pilot was unsold. The same year, Langenkamp got cast in the music video for ZZ Top's single "Sleeping Bag". Langenkamp later had roles in the ABC Afterschool Special episode "Can a Guy Say No?" and the Emmy Award-winning CBS Schoolbreak Special episode "Have You Tried Talking to Patty?", and had a guest appearance on an episode of the television series Heart of the City (all in 1986).

Following the drastic departure from the original storyline in the sequel A Nightmare on Elm Street 2: Freddy's Revenge (1985), Langenkamp felt the story of the characters from the original film was over. However, in 1986, Langenkamp received a telephone call from Craven informing her that he was considering writing the script for A Nightmare on Elm Street 3: Dream Warriors (1987) and wanted to know if she would agree to sign on to the film if he included her character. She signed on to the production in September 1986. On Craven’s original script, Langenkamp stated, "I was really excited. Nancy was a real adult. She was a woman who was very serious about herself and her life. When she realizes that Freddy’s back, she wastes no time in fighting back." Following a disagreement between Craven and production company New Line Cinema, he was replaced by Chuck Russell as director, and Nancy’s boldness was significantly toned down in script rewrites to Langenkamp’s dismay.

Langenkamp described the Dream Warriors set as intense, attributing this to time constraints and Russell becoming the director, stating, "With Chuck, the whole filmmaking process has been a bit more narrowed down and precise." However, she appreciated working with both Craven and Russell and experiencing contrasting directing styles. The film opened to box office success in 1987, grossing over $44 million. Later, she had a guest appearance as Tracy in the television series The New Adventures of Beans Baxter and Monica on the soap opera Hotel (both in 1987).

Langenkamp worked steadily on television with a series regular role as Marie Lubbock on the moderately successful ABC television series Just the Ten of Us, a spin-off of the popular ABC situation comedy Growing Pains (on which she guest-starred), from 1988 to 1990. Langenkamp reflected that working on a sitcom was a great experience, that the ensemble cast got along, and that she found it exciting to work with a new director every week. On her character, she stated, “I was the religious daughter and had a great time developing Marie’s quirky personality.” Langenkamp worked with Craven again for a small cameo appearance as a victim in his supernatural slasher film Shocker (1989). Also in 1989, she graduated from Stanford with a Bachelor of Arts in English.

=== 1990s—2000s: New Nightmare and acting hiatus ===
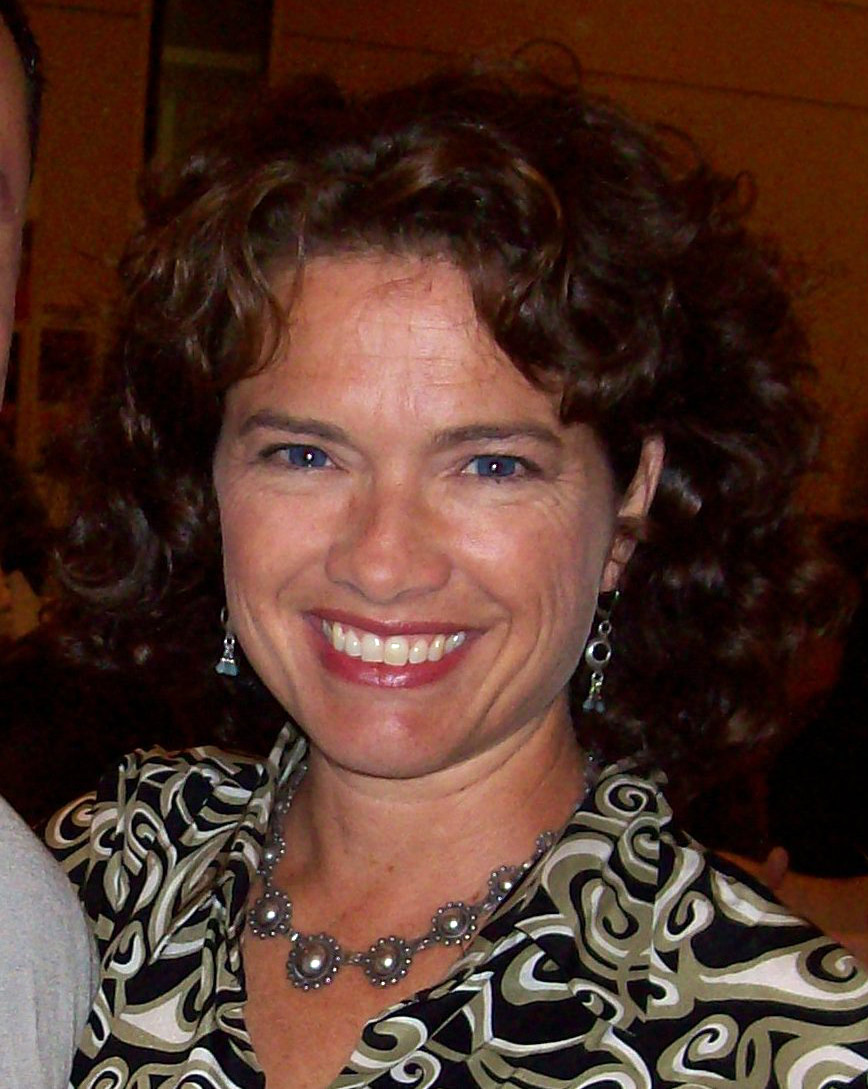
Langenkamp in 2008

Langenkamp portrayed the figure skater Nancy Kerrigan in the NBC television film Tonya & Nancy: The Inside Story, released in 1994, which focused on Tonya Harding's husband's attack. Also in 1994, Craven approached Langenkamp to star in a standalone film in the A Nightmare on Elm Street franchise that he was writing. The film, set in the real world, would feature Langenkamp portraying a fictionalized version of herself. Langenkamp was hesitant to sign on to the production due to the premise and was unsure how the film would be received. However, she agreed after having conversations with Craven. On the film, Langenkamp stated "It's a really interesting concept, and it's one of the only horror movies where the monster's really in the background, at least until the end. But it's all about our mentality about fear." Wes Craven's New Nightmare was released in 1994, and opened to critical praise, being cited as an influential "metahorror" film. Joe Leydon of Variety stated that she "proves she is still one of cinema’s most resourceful scream queens here." Langenkamp became pregnant with her daughter during the final stages of filming New Nightmare and says that after production, she struggled to put in the effort required to build a successful acting career, resulting in her taking on smaller-scale roles.

Langenkamp had a supporting role in Robert Kurtzman's cyberpunk superhero film The Demolitionist (1995). Kurtzman, a makeup artist who worked on the special effects for numerous horror films, including Dream Warriors, cast several actors from those films. In 1997, she portrayed housewife Lou Ann Solomon under the pursuit of shapeshifting aliens in an episode of the short-lived science fiction horror television series Perversions of Science. She later starred in the direct-to-video film Fugitive Mind (1999). Langenkamp played Janet Thompson in an episode of JAG (2002). Langenkamp reunited with Wes Craven for a small role as a reporter in the Dimension Films werewolf horror comedy film Cursed (2005), which would be her only film role in the 2000s. The film had a troubled production, and Langenkamp's scenes were deleted from the final version of the film.

In the early 2000s, Langenkamp and her second husband, David LeRoy Anderson, discussed launching a chewing gum business. They spent six months researching and developing. Malibu Gum Factory launched in February 2001 with 30,000 packs of peppermint-flavored chewing gum featuring a collectible trading card and water safety tips. Rather than featuring photographs of celebrities, they wanted the cards to feature regular people of Malibu, which proved popular with residents.

=== 2010s: Resurgence ===
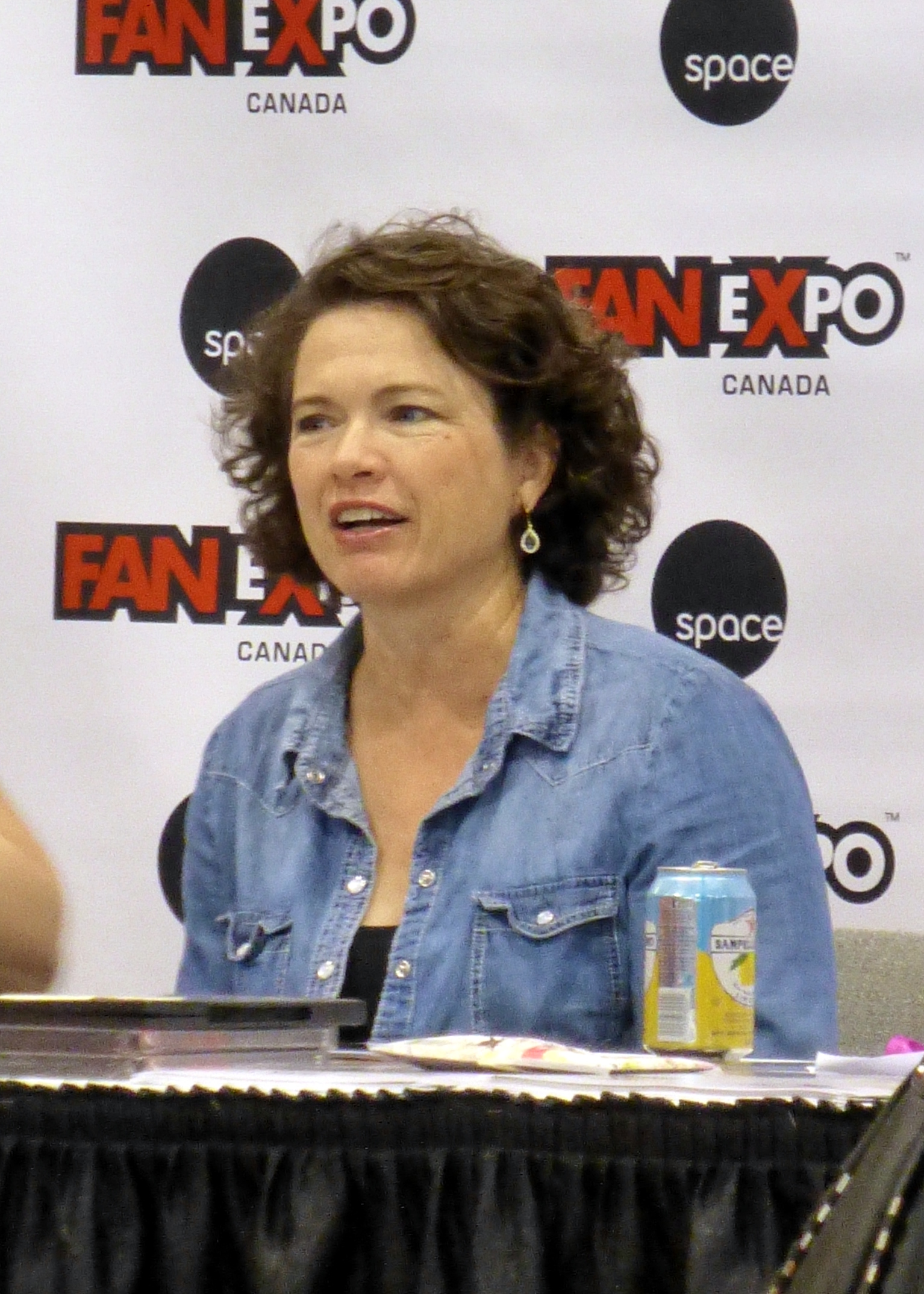
Langenkamp in 2014

On her post-A Nightmare on Elm Street career: "Women my age, you go through this decade of getting offered terrible, boring roles that don’t have anything to do with the plot. You’re just an accoutrement. It’s been such a wasteland for me.” In an effort to restart her acting career, Langenkamp executive-produced, starred in, and narrated the documentary film Never Sleep Again: The Elm Street Legacy (2010). Her follow-up effort was another documentary film that she executive-produced and starred in, I Am Nancy (2011), which focuses on the horror fandom and what both A Nightmare on Elm Street and Nancy mean to them.

Langenkamp's first acting role in a decade was in Jonathan Zarantonello's horror film The Butterfly Room (2012) as the daughter of Barbara Steele's character. Langenkamp stated, "It was the first role I’d been offered in many years that actually had substance." However, she was worried the film would be little-seen like her prior film efforts. Producer Ethan Wiley was initially hesitant to cast her due to her extensive break from acting, but was impressed by her performance. Film critic Kim Newman, writing for Screen International, singled Langenkamp out in his review, "Langenkamp—little-seen since her interesting turn in Wes Craven’s New Nightmare—is outstanding." In 2013, Langenkamp and her husband’s special effects company did the makeup effects for J. J. Abrams’s Star Trek Into Darkness (2013); Langenkamp later played a small role in heavy prosthetic makeup as an alien named Moto because a scene needed more alien designs. Langenkamp had a brief cameo appearance in Ryan Murphy's American Horror Story: Freak Show (2014) episode "Tupperware Party Massacre".

In 2015, Langenkamp portrayed Sharon Monroe in four episodes of the drama series The Bay, and narrated the short horror film Vault of the Macabre II. In 2016, she starred in the horror drama film Home. She has a cameo appearance in the horror sequel film Hellraiser: Judgment. Also that year, she portrayed the adult version of the "final girl" Donna Boone in the Syfy television horror film Truth or Dare, guiding a group of teenagers with their battle with a deadly spirit that left her physically scarred several years prior.

=== 2020s: Acting comeback ===
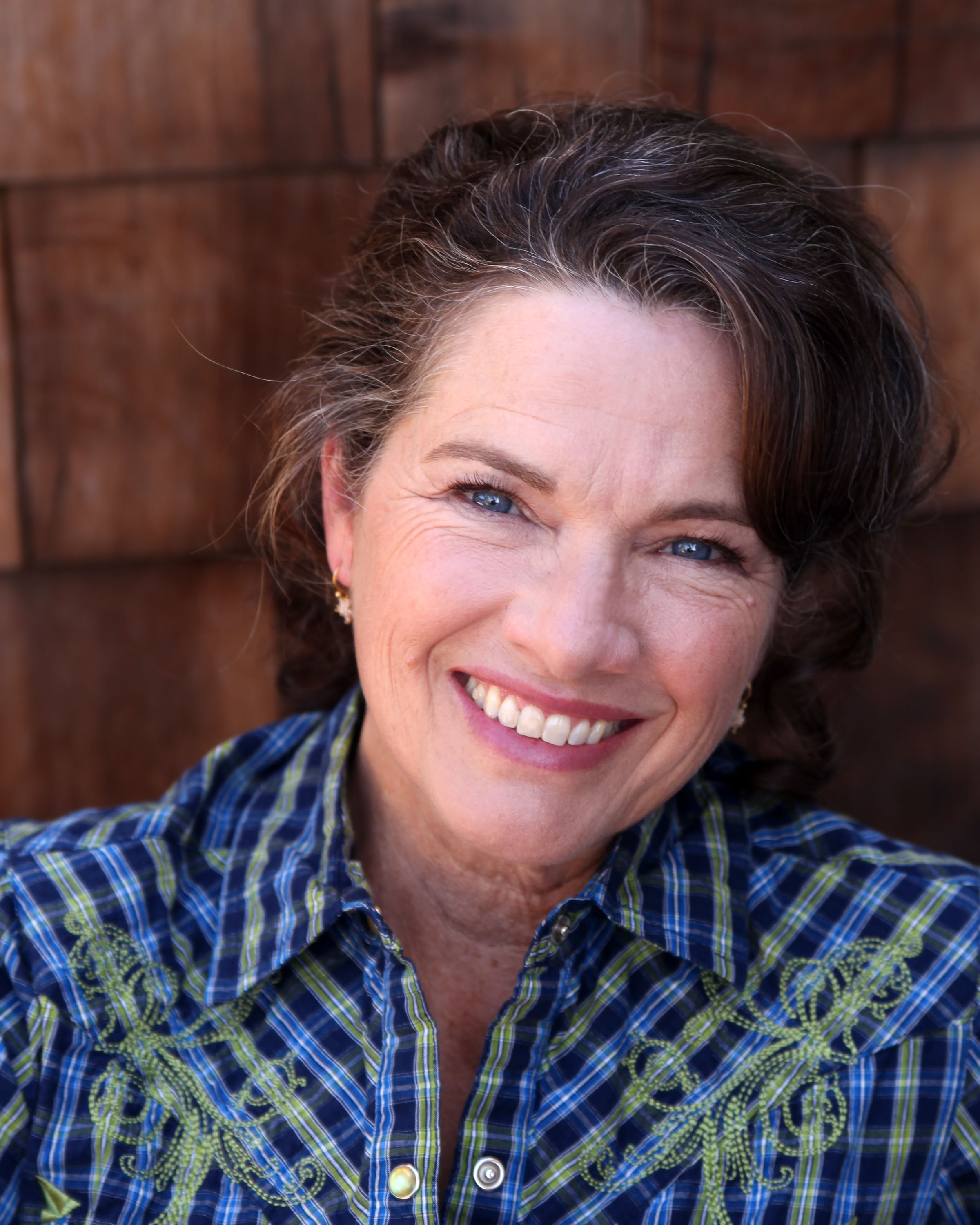
Langenkamp in 2023

Langenkamp began the 2020s with roles in voice acting, providing a voice role in an episode of the Cartoon Network adult animated horror comedy JJ Villard's Fairy Tales (2020) and multiple supporting voice roles in the animated adventure film My Little Pony: A New Generation (2021). In 2021, Langenkamp was confirmed as a main cast member in Mike Flanagan and Leah Fong's 10-episode Netflix horror mystery-thriller series The Midnight Club (2022); an adaptation of Christopher Pike's 1994 novel of the same name as well as various other Pike novels.

Langenkamp portrayed Dr. Georgina Stanton, an enigmatic doctor who runs Brightcliffe Hospice, the primary setting of the series. The series premiered on October 7, 2022. Langenkamp felt a personal connection to the role, having lost her son to brain cancer a few years prior. Although it was intended to run for multiple seasons, Netflix ultimately canceled it in December.

In 2024, Langenkamp had a supporting role as Ellenor in Spider One's horror film Little Bites, which was executive produced by Cher, followed by the crime film Plea. Flanagan later cast Langenkamp in the supporting role of Vera in his science fiction drama film The Life of Chuck (2025), based on the 2020 Stephen King novella of the same name. The Life of Chuck was released theatrically nationwide in the United States by Neon on June 13, 2025. Langenkamp later starred as the faded former showgirl Bobbi Love in the slasher film Last Chance Motel (2026). Critics praised her comic timing and highlighted her performance.

Langenkamp is set to star in Dirt.

== Personal life ==
Langenkamp has maintained a close friendship with A Nightmare on Elm Street costars Amanda Wyss and Robert Englund. Langenkamp has also developed friendships with actresses Lisa Wilcox and Tuesday Knight, who starred in additional A Nightmare on Elm Street sequels, through frequent appearances with them at fan conventions. Langenkamp states, "This group of Nightmare actors, we’ve been lucky that we’ve been thrown together a lot — going around the country to these conventions. And so, our friendships have really blossomed."

In the early 1990s, Langenkamp was informed that a stalker began making threats to her and people involved with Just the Ten of Us. The Federal Bureau of Investigation (FBI) cautioned Langenkamp to be alert with her surroundings.

Langenkamp was married to musician Alan Pasqua from 1984 until 1987. She met make-up artist David LeRoy Anderson at a wrap party for the 1988 film The Serpent and the Rainbow. They wed in 1990, in which Charlie Sheen acted as best man. Anderson and Langenkamp have two children: Daniel "Atticus" Anderson, who died in 2018 of brain tumor complications at age 26, and daughter Isabelle Anderson.

== Filmography ==
=== Film ===
Key
†	Denotes films that have not yet been released

Year	Title	Role	Notes	Ref.
1983	The Outsiders	Extra	Scenes deleted	
1983	Rumble Fish	Extra	Scenes deleted	
1984	Nickel Mountain	Callie Wells		
1984	A Nightmare on Elm Street	Nancy Thompson		
1987	A Nightmare on Elm Street 3: Dream Warriors	Nancy Thompson		
1989	Shocker	Victim	Cameo appearance	
1994	Wes Craven's New Nightmare	Herself		
1995	The Demolitionist	Christy Carruthers		
1999	Fugitive Mind	Suzanne Hicks	Direct-to-video	
2010	Never Sleep Again: The Elm Street Legacy	Narrator / Herself	Documentary film; also executive producer	
2011	I Am Nancy	Herself	Documentary film; also producer	
2012	The Butterfly Room	Dorothy		
2013	Star Trek Into Darkness	Moto	Cameo appearance	
2016	Home	Heather		
2017	Unearthed & Untold: The Path to Pet Sematary	Herself	Documentary film	
2018	Hellraiser: Judgment	Landlady	Direct-to-video; cameo appearance	
2019	Portal	Fiona		
2019	Washed Away	—N/a	Short film; director and writer	
2020	Cottonmouth	Jenn	Short film; proof of concept	
2021	My Little Pony: A New Generation	Dazzle Feather / Mayflower (voice)	As Heather Langenkamp Anderson	
2024	The Life of Chuck	Vera Stanley		
2024	Little Bites	Ellenor		
2024	Plea	Ruth Dillon		
2025	The Last Romantic	Edith	Short film	
2026	The Girl in the Street	911 Dispatcher (voice)	Short film	
2026	Another	Gabrielle		
2026	Last Chance Motel	Bobbi Love		
TBA	Dirt †	Loretta Lang		

=== Television ===
Year	Title	Role	Notes
1984	Passions	Beth Kennerly	Television film
1985	Suburban Beat	Hope Sherman	Television pilot
1986	CBS Schoolbreak Special	Erica	Episode: "Have You Tried Talking to Patty?"
1986	ABC Afterschool Special	Paula Finkle	Episode: "Can a Guy Say No?"
1986	Heart of the City	Audrey	Episode: "Of Dogs and Cat Burglars"
1987	The New Adventures of Beans Baxter	Tracy	Episode: "Beans Goes to Camp"
1987	Hotel	Monica	Episode: "Desperate Moves"
1988	Circus of the Stars #13	Herself	Television special
1988–1990	Growing Pains	Marie Lubbock / Amy Boutilier	5 episodes
1988–1990	Just the Ten of Us	Marie Lubbock	Main role (47 episodes)
1990	ABC TGIF	Marie Lubbock	Episode: "#1.19"
1994	Tonya and Nancy: The Inside Story	Nancy Kerrigan	Television film
1997	Perversions of Science	Lou Ann Solomon	Episode: "Ultimate Weapon"
1999	Partners	Suzanne	Episode: "Always..."
2000	18 Wheels of Justice	Waitress	Episode: "Genesis
2002	JAG	Janet Thompson	Episode: "Odd Man Out"
2014	American Horror Story: Freak Show	Tupperware Housewife	Uncredited; 2 episodes
2015	The Bay	Sharon Monroe	Web series; 4 episodes
2016–2020	The Bet	Herself	Web series; 4 episodes
2017	Truth or Dare	Donna Boone	Television film
2020	JJ Villard's Fairy Tales	Charla (voice)	Episode: "Boypunzel"
2022	The Midnight Club	Dr. Stanton	Main role

=== Music video ===
- "Sleeping Bag" (1985), by ZZ Top

== Awards and nominations ==
Year	Association	Category	Work	Result	Ref.
1985	Avoriaz Fantastic Film Festival	Best Performance	A Nightmare on Elm Street	Won	
1985	Young Artist Awards	Best Young Actress in a Motion Picture – Musical, Comedy, Adventure or Drama	A Nightmare on Elm Street	Nominated	
1989	Young Artist Awards	Best Young Actor/Actress Ensemble in a Television Comedy, Drama Series or Special	Just the Ten of Us	Nominated	
1995	Fangoria Chainsaw Awards	Best Actress	Wes Craven's New Nightmare	Won	
1995	Fangoria Chainsaw Awards	Fangoria Horror Hall of Fame	—N/a	Won	
2010	Fright Night Film Fest	Scream Queen of the Year	—N/a	Won	
2020	Atlanta Horror Film Festival	Best Actress	Cottonmouth	Won	
2024	Sitges Film Festival	Time Machine Award	—N/a	Won	

== Sources ==
- Hutson, Thommy (2016). Never Sleep Again: The Elm Street Legacy: The Making of Wes Craven's A Nightmare on Elm Street. Permuted Press. ISBN 978-1-61-868640-4.
- Terrace, Vincent (2024). Experimental Television, Test Films, Pilots and Trial Series, 1925 Through 1995: Seven Decades of Small Screen Almosts. McFarland. ISBN 978-1-47-663223-0.
