= Linda Solomon =

American music critic and editor (born 1937)

Linda Solomon (born May 10, 1937, Boston, Massachusetts) is an American music critic and editor. Although she has written about various aspects of popular culture, her main focus has been on folk music, blues, R&B, jazz and country music. Living at 95 Christopher Street in Greenwich Village during the early 1960s, she became a columnist for The Village Voice, capturing Village night life in club reviews for the weekly "Riffs" column.

"The Bet" is a memoir by Ted White describing Harlan Ellison, Linda Solomon and others involved in a curious incident at 95 Christopher in 1960. White wrote:

That summer Harlan found his own apartment -- three doors up the street, in a building with an elevator. And he met a woman, Linda Solomon, who also lived in the same building. Linda would go on to a career of her own in writing and editing, but that was mostly ahead of her in 1960. Linda had a small but well-selected record collection, containing a goodly amount of jazz.

A dispute over the bandleader on one record in Solomon's collection prompted Ellison to bet his entire record collection against a single album in White's collection.

Ellison also mentioned her briefly in his memoir "Memos From Purgatory."

== Reviews ==
She began doing record reviews in the early 1960s. Her Village Voice review of The Freewheelin' Bob Dylan (1963) has been quoted in several books, including David Hajdu's Positively 4th Street: The Lives and Times of Joan Baez, Bob Dylan, Mimi Baez Fariña and Richard Fariña (Farrar, Straus and Giroux, 2001):

He stands outside his problems and writes a credo for people to live by. The emotional understatement in his voice emphasizes the power of his lyrics and his genuine concern for the state of the world.

== ABC-TV Hootenanny ==
In 1963-64, Solomon edited ABC-TV Hootenanny, a magazine featuring the folk musicians who appeared on the television series Hootenanny, telecast on ABC from April 6, 1963 to September 12, 1964. For one of the magazine's cover stories she interviewed Chad Mitchell and asked, "I've heard criticism of the Chad Mitchell Trio to the extent that politics and entertainment don't mix, that people come to a club or concert to be entertained and not to be confronted with the troubles of the world. Do you feel that your group is becoming too messagey?"

Mitchell responded:

Different people seem to be entertained by different things. For some, an hour of juggling and trained animal acts is a fine evening's entertainment. Others prefer an evening with Mort Sahl, Lenny Bruce or Shelley Berman. The success of these performers seems to indicate that entertainment and socio-political themes do mix. It's simply a matter of taste as to what you prefer. As for becoming messagey, satire has been a traditional art form for hundreds of years, and by definition ridicules a social or political point of view or event. We are simply following in the footsteps of the goliards of the Middle Ages, the Jonathan Swifts of the post-Restoration era and the Julius Monks of the 1960s.

Contributors to ABC-TV Hootenanny included Theodore Bikel and Jean Shepherd. At the same time that Solomon was editing ABC-TV Hootenanny, her friend Robert Shelton, with Lynn Musgrave, edited a different magazine with a similar title, Hootenanny. While Shelton and Musgrave covered the full range of folk music, Solomon's magazine mainly focused on the musicians booked on the ABC series. This included such talents as the Anchormen, Eddy Arnold, Theodore Bikel, Oscar Brand, The Brothers Four, the Clancy Brothers and Tommy Makem, Judy Collins, the Cumberland Three, Lester Flatt and Earl Scruggs, Pete Fountain, Judy Henske, Jim Kweskin & the Jug Band, the Limeliters, the Smothers Brothers and Doc Watson.

== NME ==
In addition to work as a publicist for Chess Records, Solomon was the New York editor of NME during the 1970s. She has been a freelance contributor to numerous magazines and newspapers, including Celebrity, Country Music, Crawdaddy!, Down Beat, Hit Parader, NME, The News World, Nostalgia Illustrated, SoHo Weekly News and Us. Reviewing country singer-songwriter James Talley for the February 4, 1979 issue of The News World, she wrote:

If you like Carl Sandburg, Woody Guthrie, Jimmy Reed and Little Feat, you'll probably like James Talley, his songs and his albums... his writing is a home run that touches base for most people. Simplicity is the key, but his lyrics are deceptively simple.

She has written liner notes for folk music recordings, such as All Star Hootenanny (Columbia, 1964), along with liner notes for such recording artists as Charlie Byrd, John Handy, Mahalia Jackson and Charlie Rich.

After 39 years living in New York's Greenwich Village, Solomon relocated to Houston, Texas in 1999.

Her father was the author-psychiatrist Dr. Philip Solomon, and her maternal uncle was the WPA artist Aaron Gelman.
