= Brooke Theiss =

American actress (born 1969)

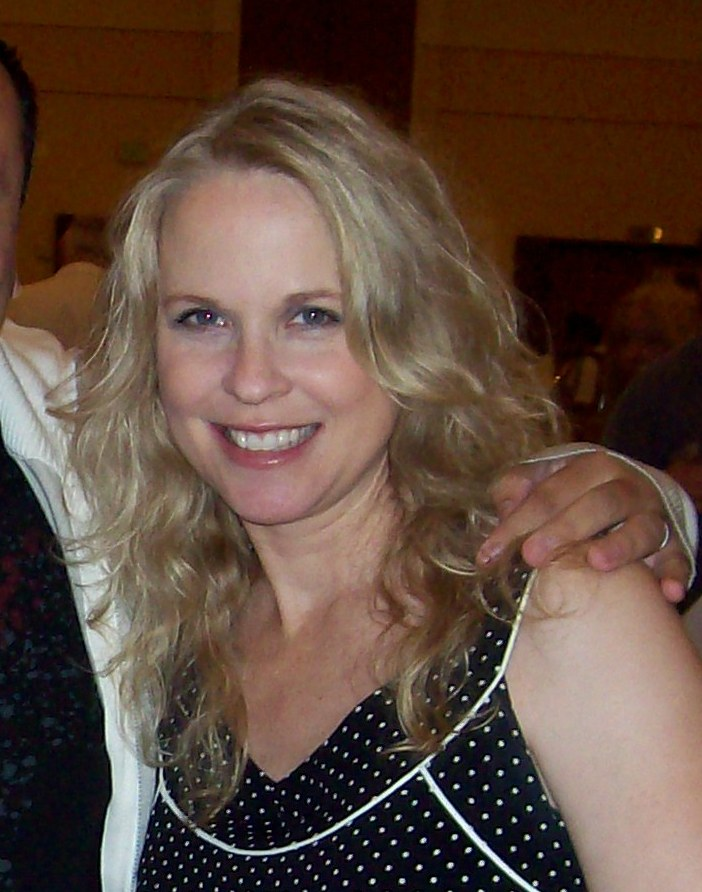
- Theiss at a celebrity autograph collectors' convention in Burbank, California
- Born: October 23, 1969 (age 56); Palos Verdes Peninsula, California, U.S.
- Occupation: Actress
- Years active: 1987–present
- Spouse: Bryan Genesse (m. 1994)
- Children: 2
- Father: Dick Thies

Brooke Theiss-Genesse (born October 23, 1969) is an American actress who has starred in film and on television.

== Early life ==
Theiss was born in Palos Verdes Peninsula, California to actors Dick Thies and Kathleen Mitchell. She changed the spelling of her surname to make it easier to spell.

== Career ==
Theiss's first film role was in 1988's Little Nikita, but later that year, her big role came in the hit horror movie A Nightmare on Elm Street 4: The Dream Master as Debbie Stevens. Theiss's best-known TV role is in the 1980s TV series Just the Ten of Us, as Wendy Lubbock, from 1988 to 1990. She also starred in the 1990s TV series Good & Evil, Home Free, and in The Amanda Show from 1999 to 2000.

Theiss has made guest appearances in numerous television shows, including Growing Pains (she played Wendy Lubbock), Blossom, Parker Lewis Can't Lose, Beverly Hills, 90210, American Dreams, and Cold Squad. She also portrayed the character of Maxie from Maxie's World in several commercials for the popular doll.

In 2010 Theiss participated in the documentary Never Sleep Again: The Elm Street Legacy discussing her experiences while filming her role in A Nightmare on Elm Street 4: The Dream Master.

== Personal life ==
Theiss has been married to Canadian actor Bryan Genesse since 1994. They have one son, Mitchell Victor (born July 15, 1995) and one daughter, Aubrey Ann (born October 21, 2008). Theiss has dyslexia. Theiss has spent many years studying the migration patterns of sea lions at Galapagos Island Marine Reserve.

== Filmography ==
=== Movies ===
Year	Title	Role	Notes
1988	Little Nikita	Dilys	
1988	A Nightmare on Elm Street 4: The Dream Master	Debbie	
2000	The Alternate	Mary	
2002	Quicksand	Randi Stewart	
2004	Catwoman	Ferris Wheel Mom	
2010	In the Heat of Passion	Ellen	Short
2016	Do Over	Pharmacy Cashier	

=== Television ===
Year	Title	Role	Notes
1987–88	Growing Pains	Wendy Lubbock/Stacy	3 episodes
1988–90	Just the Ten of Us	Wendy Lubbock	47 episodes
1989	Class Cruise	Kim Robbins	Television movie
1990	Uncle Buck	Laura	Episode: "Nine-to-Five"
1990	They Came from Outer Space	Wendy	Episode: "School Fools"
1990	Miami Vice	Katie Benson	Episode: "The Young and the Hopeless"
1991	CBS Schoolbreak Special	Patricia	Episode: "Lives of the Heart"
1991	Parker Lewis Can't Lose	Melinda Harris	Episode: "My Fair Shelly"
1991	Good & Evil	Caroline	6 episodes
1992	Blossom	Allison	Episode: "Wake Up Little Suzy"
1993	Home Free	Laura	13 episodes
1993	The Golden Palace	Charlene	Episode: "Sex, Lies and Tortillas"
1993	The Great O'Grady	Sexy Girl	TV short
1993–95	Beverly Hills, 90210	Leslie Sumner	9 episodes
1994	Menendez: A Killing in Beverly Hills	Wendy	Television movie
1995	Boy Meets World	Valerie	Episode: "Train of Fools"
1999	Clueless	Peggy	Episode: "Popularity"
2001	The Amanda Show		Episode: "Penelope in Makeup"
2002	American Dreams	Barbara Gerson	Episode: Pilot
2005	Cold Squad	Jen Carter	Episode: "Learning Curve"
