= 10th Youth in Film Awards =

1989 US media awards ceremony

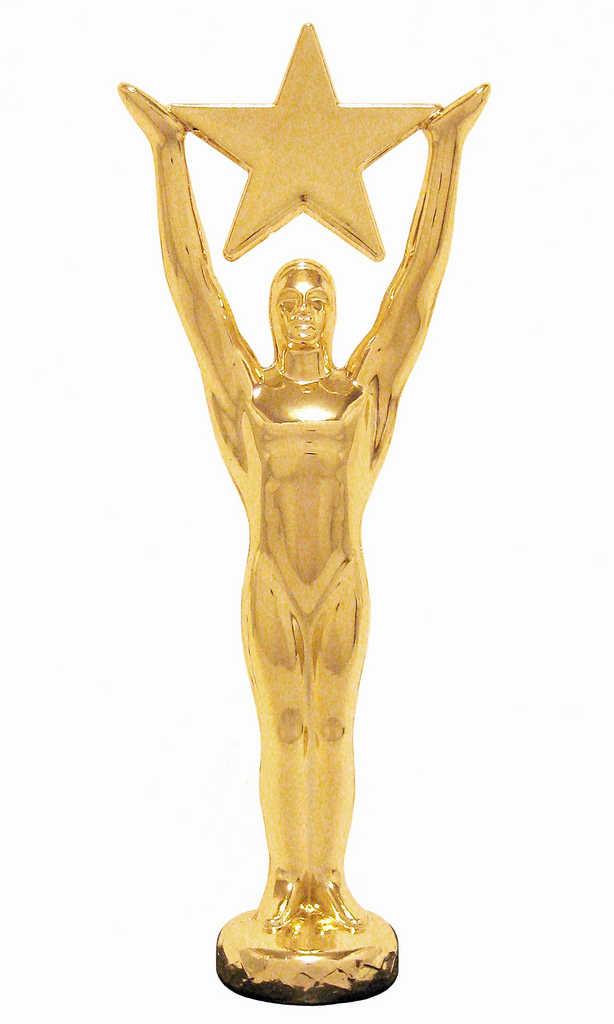
- Awarded for: Achievement in the 1987—1988 season
- Date: May 6, 1989
- Site: Registry Hotel; Universal City, California
- Hosted by: Kirk Cameron and Neil Patrick Harris

The 10th Youth in Film Awards ceremony (now known as the Young Artist Awards), presented by the Youth in Film Association, honored outstanding youth performers under the age of 21 in the fields of film, television, theater and music for the 1987-1988 season, and took place on May 6, 1989, at the Registry Hotel in Universal City, California.

Established in 1978 by long-standing Hollywood Foreign Press Association member, Maureen Dragone, the Youth in Film Association was the first organization to establish an awards ceremony specifically set to recognize and award the contributions of performers under the age of 21 in the fields of film, television, theater and music.

The 10th Youth in Film Awards marked the first year the ceremony was moved from the fall to the spring (the previous 9th Youth in Film Awards ceremony taking place in December 1987). This 5 month "push-back" effectively resulted in no ceremony taking place during the 1988 calendar year, however, performances during late 1987 and 1988 were recognized at the 10th annual ceremony.

== Categories ==
★ Bold indicates the winner in each category.

== Best Young Performer in a Motion Picture ==
=== Best Young Actor in a Motion Picture: Drama ===
★ Christian Bale - Empire of the Sun (Warner Bros)

- Warwick Davis - Willow (M.G.M.)
- Kevin Dillon - The Rescue (Touchstone)
- Sebastian Rice-Edwards - Hope and Glory
- Neil Patrick Harris - Clara's Heart (Warner Bros)
- Roland Harrah III - Braddock: Missing in Action III (Cannon Films)
- Darius McCrary - Mississippi Burning
- Doudi Shoua - Rambo III

=== Best Young Actress in a Motion Picture: Drama ===
★ Hayley Taylor Block - Touch of a Stranger (Raven Star)

- Annabeth Gish - Mystic Pizza (Samuel-Goldwyn)
- Laura Jane Goodwin - Crystalstone (Moviestore Entertainment)
- Marcie Leeds - Beaches (Touchstone)
- Mindy McEnnan - World Gone Wild (Apollo Pictures)
- Martha Plimpton - Running on Empty (Warner Bros)
- Julia Roberts - Mystic Pizza (Samuel-Goldwyn)
- Meredith Salenger - A Night in the Life of Jimmy Reardon (20th Century Fox)

=== Best Young Actor in a Motion Picture: Comedy or Fantasy ===
★ (tie) Corey Feldman - License to Drive (20th Century Fox)
★ (tie) Corey Haim - License to Drive (20th Century Fox)

- Jade Calegory - Mac and Me (Orion Pictures)
- David Moscow - Big (20th Century Fox)
- Jared Rushton - Big (20th Century Fox)
- Jamie Wild - Overboard (M.G.M.)

=== Best Young Actress in a Motion Picture: Comedy or Fantasy ===
★ Mayim Bialik - Beaches (Touchstone)

- Tina Caspary - Mac and Me (Orion Pictures)
- Angela Goethals - Heartbreak Hotel (Touchstone)
- Heather Graham - License To Drive (20th Century Fox)
- Alyson Hannigan - My Stepmother Is an Alien (Columbia)
- Lauren Stanley - Mac and Me (Orion Pictures)

=== Best Young Actor in a Motion Picture: Horror or Mystery ===
★ Lukas Haas - Lady in White (New Century Vista Film Company)

- Rodney Eastman - A Nightmare on Elm Street 4: The Dream Master (New Line Cinema)
- Ricky Paull Goldin - The Blob (Tri-Star)
- Andras Jones - A Nightmare on Elm Street 4: The Dream Master (New Line Cinema)
- Michael Kenworthy - Return of the Living Dead Part II (Lorimar)
- Kieran O'Brien - Bellman and True (Island Pictures)

=== Best Young Actress in a Motion Picture: Horror or Mystery ===
★ Kristy Swanson - Flowers in the Attic (New World Pictures)

- Jennifer Banko - Friday the 13th Part VII: The New Blood (Paramount)
- Paula Irvine - Phantasm II (Universal)
- Marcie Leeds - Near Dark (Anchor Bay Entertainment)
- Shawnee Smith - The Blob (TriStar)
- Ebony Smith - Lethal Weapon (Warner Bros)
- Brooke Theiss - A Nightmare on Elm Street 4: The Dream Master (New Line Cinema)

=== Best Young Actor in a Student Film ===
★ Ryan Leigh Lewis - Little Brother (USC)

- Robert Arnett - Come in Johnny (LACC)
- Adam Carl - Rose and Katz (AFI)
- Josh Wiener - Stead Fast Boy (AFI)

=== Best Young Actress in a Student Film ===
★ Jessica Leigh Hinds - Edifice Complex

- Maleshea Afle Hurts - Jack in the Box
- Jasmine Hicks - Halmoni, First Bow

=== Best Young Actor/Actress in a Film Made for Video ===
★ Brandon Quintin Adams - Moonwalker (Warner Bros)

- Shalane McCall - Modeling, What It Takes
- Jared Rushton - Kidsongs

== Best Young Performer in a TV Special, TV Movie or Mini-Series ==
=== Best Young Actor in a TV Special, Pilot, Movie of the Week, or Mini-Series ===
★ Lukas Haas - A Place at the Table (NBC)

- Adam Carl - Down Delaware Road (NBC)
- Steven Dorff - Mutts (ABC)
- Michael Faustino - Home Sweet Homeless (CBS)
- Ross Harris - Home Sweet Homeless (CBS)
- Matthew Lawrence - David (ABC)
- James Marshall - Date Rape (ABC)
- Jason Oliver - I'll Be Home for Christmas (NBC)
- Vonni Ribisi - Promised A Miracle (CBS)
- Ricky Schroder - Too Young the Hero (CBS)
- R. J. Williams - Windmills of the Gods (CBS)
- Chris Young - Dance 'til Dawn (NBC)

=== Best Young Actress in a TV Special, Pilot, Movie of the Week, or Mini-Series ===
★ Jenny Lewis - My Father, My Son (CBS)

- Jaclyn Bernstein - A Very Brady Christmas (CBS)
- Olivia Burnette - Stoning In Fulham County (NBC)
- Tonya Crowe - A Family Again (ABC)
- Lili Haydn - Dakota's Way
- Gennie James - The Secret Garden (CBS)
- Alyssa Milano - Dance 'til Dawn (NBC)
- Devon Odessa - Down Delaware Road (NBC)
- Vicki Wauchope - The Outsiders (FOX)

== Best Young Performer in a Television Series ==
=== Best Young Actor in a Nighttime Drama Series ===
★ Chad Allen - Our House (NBC)

- Raffi Di Blasio - Almost Grown (CBS)
- Brandon Douglas - Falcon Crest (CBS)
- John Frandlin - Beauty and the Beast (CBS)
- Robert Gorman - Falcon Crest (CBS)
- Brian Austin Green - Knots Landing (CBS)
- Brian Lando - Paradise (CBS)
- Matthew Newmark - Paradise (CBS)
- Danny Nucci - Falcon Crest (CBS)
- Garland Spencer - Beauty and the Beast (CBS)

=== Best Young Actress in a Nighttime Drama Series ===
★ Tonya Crowe - Knots Landing (CBS)

- Jenny Beck - Paradise (CBS)
- Alyson Croft - Blue Skies

=== Best Young Actor Starring in a Television Comedy Series ===
★ Fred Savage - The Wonder Years (ABC)

- Brice Beckham - Mr. Belvedere (ABC)
- Christopher Barnes - Day by Day (NBC)
- David Faustino - Married... with Children (FOX TV)
- Benji Gregory - ALF (NBC)
- Whitby Hertford - Family Man (ABC)
- Taliesin Jaffe - She's the Sheriff (Lorimar)
- Jeremy Licht - The Hogan Family (NBC)
- Danny Pintauro - Who's the Boss? (ABC)
- Danny Ponce - The Hogan Family (NBC)

=== Best Young Actress Starring in a Television Comedy Series ===
★ Christina Applegate - Married... with Children (FOX TV)

- Candace Cameron - Full House (ABC)
- Andrea Elson - ALF (NBC)
- Khrystyne Haje - Head of the Class (ABC)
- Staci Keanan - My Two Dads (NBC)
- Jodie Sweetin - Full House (ABC)
- Tannis Vallely - Head of the Class (ABC)
- Tracy Wells - Mr. Belvedere (ABC)
- Tina Yothers - Family Ties (NBC)

=== Best Young Actor in a Daytime Drama Series ===
★ Michael Bays - Days of Our Lives (NBC)

- Thom Bierdz - The Young and the Restless (CBS)
- Matt Crane - Another World (NBC)
- Braden Danner - One Life to Live (ABC)
- Justin Gocke - Santa Barbara (NBC)
- John Preston - General Hospital (ABC)
- Darrell Utley - Days of Our Lives (NBC)

=== Best Young Actress in a Daytime Drama Series ===
★ Lauralee Bell - The Young and the Restless (CBS)

- Christie Clark - Days of Our Lives (NBC)
- Ami Dolenz - General Hospital (ABC)
- Kimberly McCullough - General Hospital (ABC)
- Charlotte Ross - Days of Our Lives (NBC)

=== Best Young Actor Guest-Starring in a Drama or Comedy Series ===
★ Chad Allen - My Two Dads (NBC)

- Kirk Cameron - Straight at Ya
- Andre Gower - The Hogann Family (NBC)
- Christian Guzek - Highway to Heaven (NBC)
- Jason Horst - Highway to Heaven (NBC)
- Bobby Jacoby - Who's the Boss? (ABC)
- Allan Kayser - Mama's Family (NBC)
- Michael Rich - A Year in the Life (NBC)
- Kaylan Romero - Family Ties (NBC)
- Robin Thicke - The Wonder Years (ABC)

=== Best Young Actress Guest-Starring in a Drama or Comedy Series ===
★ Devon Odessa - Highway to Heaven (NBC)

- Olivia Burnette - Disaster at Silo 7 (ABC)
- Holly Fields - It's Garry Shandling's Show (FOX TV)
- Heather Haase - Superboy (CBS)
- Laura Jacoby - Mr. Belvedere (ABC)
- Jenny Lewis - The Golden Girls (NBC)

=== Best Young Actor in a Featured, Co-Starring, Supporting, Recurring Role in a Comedy, Drama Series, or Special ===
★ Hakeem Abdul-Samad - Amen (NBC)

- Josh Blake - ALF (NBC)
- Scott Bloom - Who's the Boss? (ABC)
- Cory Danziger - Beauty and the Beast (CBS)
- Robert Gorman - Falcon Crest (CBS)
- Jason Hervey - The Wonder Years (ABC)
- Frederick Koehler - Kate & Allie (CBS)
- Vonni Ribisi - My Two Dads (NBC)
- Josh Saviano - The Wonder Years (ABC)
- Scott Sherk - It's Garry Shandling's Show (FOX TV)

=== Best Young Actress in a Featured, Co-Starring, Supporting, Recurring Role in a Comedy, Drama Series, or Special ===
★ Danica McKellar - The Wonder Years (ABC)

- Lecy Goranson - Roseanne (ABC)
- Amy Hathaway - My Two Dads (NBC)
- Ocean Hellman - Almost Grown (CBS)
- Chelsea Hertford - Murphy Brown (CBS)
- Christina Nigra - Out of This World (KTLA)
- Countess Vaughn - 227 (NBC)
- Alitzah Wiener - My Two Dads (NBC)

== Best Young Performer in Syndicated Television ==
=== Best Young Actor in a Family Syndicated Show ===
★ Wil Wheaton - Star Trek: The Next Generation (Syndication)

- Steve Burton - Out of This World (KTLA)
- Jason Marsden - The Munsters Today (Syndication)
- Jerry O'Connell - My Secret Identity (Syndication)
- Alexander Polinsky - Charles in Charge (KTLA)
- Paul C. Scott - Small Wonder (FOX TV)

=== Best Young Actress in a Family Syndicated Show ===
★ Josie Davis - Charles in Charge (KTLA)

- Tiffany Brissette - Small Wonder (FOX TV)
- Nicole Eggert - Charles in Charge (KTLA)
- Maureen Flannigan - Out of This World (KTLA)
- Emily Schulman - Small Wonder (FOX TV)
- Hilary Van Dyke - The Munsters Today (Syndication)

=== Best Young Actor Guest-Starring in a Syndicated Family Comedy, Drama, or Special ===
★ David Hoskins - Superior Court (Warner Bros. Television)

- Seth Green - The Facts of Life (NBC)
- Ryan Bollman - Mama's Family (NBC)
- Scott Grimes - Frog (Wonderworks/PBS)
- Scott Nemes - Out of This World (KTLA)
- David Wagner - Family Medical Center (Lorimar)

=== Best Young Actress Guest-Starring in a Syndicated Family Comedy, Drama, or Special ===
★ Robin Lynn Heath - Superior Court (Warner Bros. Television)

- Soleil Moon Frye - Mickey's 60th Birthday (NBC)
- Bettina - Family Medical Center (Lorimar)
- Tamlyn Tomita - Hiroshima Maiden (Wonderworks/PBS)

== Best Young Performer in Cable Television ==
=== Best Young Actor in a Cable Family Series ===
★ Christopher Crabb - Danger Bay (Disney Channel)

- Mark-Paul Gosselaar - Good Morning, Miss Bliss (Disney Channel)
- Kipp Marcus - The New Leave It to Beaver (WTBS)
- Joshua Miller - On The Edge
- Josh Milton - Young, Young Comedians
- Scott Nemes - It's Garry Shandling's Show (Showtime)
- Eric Osmond - The New Leave It to Beaver (WTBS)
- Andrew Sabiston - The Edison Twins (Disney Channel)
- John Snee - The New Leave It to Beaver (WTBS)

=== Best Young Actress in a Cable Family Series ===
★ Kaleena Kiff - The New Leave It to Beaver (WTBS)

- Lindsay Boyd - The New Our Gang (WTBS)
- Ocean Hellman - Danger Bay (Disney Channel)
- Risa Schiffnan - The New Our Gang (WTBS)
- Lark Voorhies - Good Morning, Miss Bliss (Disney Channel)

=== Best Young Actor in a Cable Family Show ===
★ Justin Hinds - ABC Afterschool Special - Just a Regular Kid: An AIDS Story (ABC)

- Doug Emerson - Good Old Boy: A Delta Boyhood
- Ryan Francis - Good Old Boy: A Delta Boyhood
- Christian Guzek - The New Our Gang (WTBS)
- Brandon Stewart - Lessons to Remember

=== Best Young Actress in a Cable Family Show ===
★ Jenny Lewis - A Friendship in Vienna (Disney Channel)

- Robin Lynn Heath - Lessons to Remember
- Lindsay Boyd - The New Our Gang (WTBS)

== Best Young Performer Under 9 Years of Age ==
=== Best Young Actor Under 9 Years of Age ===
★ Brian Bonsall - Family Ties (NBC)

- Todd Cameron Brown - Family Medical Center (Lorimar)
- Justin Burnette - Dynasty (ABC)
- Michael Carter - Paradise (CBS)
- Michael Fishman - Roseanne (ABC)
- Joshua Harris - Dallas (CBS)
- Luke Rossi - Thirtysomething (ABC)

=== Best Young Actress Under 9 Years of Age ===
★ Thora - Purple People Eater (Anchor Bay Entertainment)

- Marie Martin - Little Girl Lost (ABC)
- Ashley Millan - The Young and the Restless (CBS)

=== Best Young Actor/Actress Under 5 Years of Age ===
★ Mary-Kate and Ashley Olsen - Full House (ABC)

- Nathaniel Guzek - Family Medical Center (Lorimar)
- Brighton Hertford - General Hospital (ABC)
- Brandon Kasper - Falcon Crest (CBS)
- Michelle and Kristine Kennedy - Baby Boom (NBC)

== Best Young Performer in a Voice-Over Role ==
=== Best Young Actor Voice-Over Role ===
★ Max Meier - Kissyfur (NBC)

- Shawn Donahue - Dino-Riders (Marvel Productions/TYCO)
- Michael Faustino - ALF: The Animated Series (NBC)
- Tim Hoskins - The New Adventures of Winnie the Pooh (ABC)
- Brandon Stewart - This Is America, Charlie Brown (CBS)

=== Best Young Actress Voice-Over Role ===
★ Soleil Moon Frye - It's Punky Brewster (NBC)

- Bettina - My Little Pony 'n Friends (Sunbow Productions)
- Erin Chase - This Is America, Charlie Brown (CBS)
- Ami Foster - This Is America, Charlie Brown (CBS)
- Joanna Schellenberg - Beverly Hills Teens (DIC Enterprises)

== Best Young Ensemble Performance ==
=== Best Young Actor/Actress Ensemble in a Television Comedy, Drama Series, or Special ===
★ The Cosby Show (NBC) - Malcolm-Jamal Warner, Tempestt Bledsoe, Keshia Knight Pulliam, Lisa Bonet, Sabrina Le Beauf, Geoffrey Owens and Deon Richmond

- The Big Five (Weintraub Entertainment Group) - Sean Baca, Maia Brewton, Todd Cameron Brown, Ryan Cash and Cory Danziger
- Just the Ten of Us (ABC) - Heather Langenkamp, Brooke Theiss, Jamie Luner, JoAnn Willette, Matt Shakman and Heidi Zeigler
- Day by Day (NBC) - Thora Birch, Christopher Finefrock, Bobby Chanez, Garrett Taylor, Anthony McConnell, Gino De Mauro and Mark Gordon
- After the Promise (CBS) - Trey Ames, Don Jeffcoat, Ryan Francis, Andy Woodworth, Chance Michael Corbett, Richard Billingsley, David French, Benjamin Turner, Ryan Heavenor, Love Verwoerd, Gary Verwoerd, Slone Romano and Mark Hildreth

== Best Young Performer in Theater ==
=== Best Young Actor in Theater ===
★ Brice Beckham - Quirks (Cast Theater)

- Phillip Glasser - Les Misérables (Shubert Theater)
- Justin Hines - Have a Jewish Christmas (Burbank Theater)
- Joshua C. Williams - Les Misérables (Shubert Theater)
- Ben Wylie - The Nutcracker (Joffrey Ballet, Music Center)
- Jamie McEnnan - Macbeth (Globe Theater)

=== Best Young Actress in Theater ===
★ Tricia Cast - The Diary of Anne Frank (Jean De Basci Theater)

- Tanya Fenmore - Quirks (Cast Theater)
- Jessica Ann Lightbourn - Les Misérables (Shubert Theater)
- Kimberly McCullough - Les Misérables (Shubert Theater)
- Amanda Jo Steppe - Les Misérables (Shubert Theater)
- Danuta Tangalos - The Nutcracker (Joffrey Ballet, Music Center)
- Mindy McEnnan - Mother's Day Always Falls on Sunday (White PPO Center)

== Most Promising Young Vocal Recording Artist ==
=== Most Promising Young Vocal Recording Artist: Actor ===
★ Henry Penzy

- Scott Grimes
- Corey Feldman
- Billy Jacoby and the Strangers

=== Most Promising Young Vocal Recording Artist: Actress ===
★ Tina Yothers

- Jill Colucci
- Holly Fields
- Alitzah Wiener

== Best Family Television Entertainment ==
=== Best Family TV Special ===
★ A Very Brady Christmas

- After the Promise
- David
- Little Girl Lost
- Promised A Miracle
- Too Young the Hero
- Legend Of Firefly Marsh

=== Best Family Television Series ===
★ The Wonder Years (ABC)

- Alf (NBC)
- The Cosby Show (NBC)
- Day by Day (NBC)
- Full House (NBC)
- Growing Pains (ABC)
- Head of the Class (ABC)
- The Hogan Family (NBC)
- Just the Ten of Us (ABC)
- Kate & Allie (CBS)
- Mr. Belvedere (ABC)
- My Two Dads (NBC)
- Perfect Strangers (ABC)

=== Best New Television Series ===
★ Roseanne (ABC)

- Almost Grown (CBS)
- Empty Nest (NBC)
- Paradise (CBS)

=== Best Syndicated Family TV Comedy or Drama Series ===
★ Star Trek: The Next Generation

- Charles in Charge
- My Secret Identity
- Out of this World
- Small Wonder
- The Munsters Today

=== Best Cable Family TV Comedy, Drama Series or Special ===
★ Lessons To Remember (HBO)

- Danger Bay (Disney Channel)
- Good Morning, Miss Bliss (Disney Channel)
- It's Garry Shandling's Show (Showtime)
- The New Leave It To Beaver (WTBS)
- The New Our Gang (Disney Channel)
- Necessary Parties (Wonderworks/PBS)

=== Best Animation Series ===
★ Garfield and Friends (Lee Mendelson)

- ALF: The Animated Series (Alien Productions)
- Beverly Hills Teens (DIC)
- DuckTales (Disney)
- Star Wars: Ewoks (Nelvana)
- Disney's Adventures of the Gummi Bears (Disney)
- Jem (Marvel)
- My Little Pony (Marvel)
- Kissyfur (Saban Productions)
- Real Ghostbusters (DIC)
- Teenage Mutant Ninja Turtles (Murakami, Wolf Swenson)

== Best Family Motion Picture Entertainment ==
=== Best Family Motion Picture: Animation or Fantasy ===
★Beetlejuice (WB)

- Oliver & Company (Disney)
- The Land Before Time (Universal Pictures)
- Mac and Me (Orion Pictures)
- My Stepmother is an Alien (Columbia- Weintraub Ent.)

=== Best Family Motion Picture: Comedy ===
★ Batteries Not Included (Universal)

- Big (20th Century Fox)
- Heartbreak Hotel (Disney)
- Overboard (MGM)
- Three Men and a Baby (Disney)

=== Best Family Motion Picture: Drama ===
★ Empire of the Sun (Universal)

- Beaches (Touchstone)
- Clara's Heart (Warner Brothers)
- Hope and Glory (Columbia and Warner Brothers)
- Running on Empty (Warner Brothers)
- Stand and Deliver (Warner Brothers)
- Willow (MGM)

=== Teen-Age Choice for Best Horror Motion Picture ===
★ A Nightmare on Elm Street IV: The Dream Master

- Friday the 13th Part VII: The New Blood
- Lady in White
- Return of the Living Dead Part II
- The Blob

=== Best Student Film ===
★ Stead Fast Boy (AFI)

- Animation by Children (David Lasday)
- Little Brother (USC)
- Out to Lunch (AFI)
- Rose and Katz (AFI)
- Johnny Come In (LACC)

== Youth In Film's Special Awards ==
=== Outstanding Young Stand-Up Comic ===
★ Scott Nemes

=== Youngest Achiever in Business and Entertainment ===
★ Randy Miller

=== Former Child Star Life Achievement Award ===
★ Barry Williams of The Brady Bunch

=== The Michael Landon Award ===
==== Outstanding Contribution To Youth Through Television ====
★ The young cast of Stand and Deliver

=== The Jackie Coogan Award ===
==== Outstanding Contribution to Youth Through Entertainment ====
★ William Hanna and Joseph Barbera

=== Best Foreign Film ===
★ Pelle the Conqueror (Denmark)

=== Best Young Actor in a Foreign Film ===
★ Pelle Hvenegaard (Denmark) - For his role in Pelle the Conqueror

=== Best Young Actress in a Foreign Film ===
★ Vanessa Guedj (France) - For her role in Le Grand Chemin
