= ALF season 3 =

ALF
- Season 3
- DVD cover
- No. of episodes: 24

Release
- Original network: NBC
- Original release: October 3, 1988 – May 8, 1989

Season chronology
- ← Previous; Season 2 Next → Season 4

The following is a list of episodes from the third season of ALF. Most episode titles are named after popular songs.

== Broadcast history ==
The season aired Mondays at 8:00-8:30 pm (EST) on NBC.

== DVD release ==
The season was released on DVD by Lionsgate Home Entertainment.

== Cast ==
- Paul Fusco as ALF (puppeteer, voice)
  - Lisa Buckley as ALF (assistant puppeteer)
  - Bob Fappiano as ALF (assistant puppeteer)
- Max Wright as Willie Tanner
- Anne Schedeen as Kate Tanner
- Andrea Elson as Lynn Tanner
- Benji Gregory as Brian Tanner
- Charles Nickerson as Eric Tanner (debuted in "Having My Baby")

== Episodes ==
All the season 3 episodes titles are based on a respective song from the real life. (See the Note below.)

No. overall	No. in season	Title	Directed by	Written by	Original release date	Prod. code	U.S. viewers (millions)	Rating/share (households)
50	1	"Stop in the Name of Love"	Nick Havinga	Skip Frank & Gwyn Gurian	October 3, 1988	3001	29.6	18.3/29
Lynn's date at the drive-in goes well until she discovers ALF hiding in the back of the car. Note: Josh Blake (Jake Ochmonek) and Liz Sheridan (Raquel Ochmonek) do not appear in this episode. The episode title is based on the Supremes song.
51	2	"Stairway to Heaven"	Burt Brinckerhoff	Philip Whitehill	October 10, 1988	3005	28.7	17.6/27
ALF meets his guardian angel who makes him see life without the Tanners, and vice versa. Note: John LaMotta (Trevor Ochmonek) and Josh Blake (Jake Ochmonek) do not appear in this episode. The episode title is based on the Led Zeppelin song.
52	3	"Breaking Up is Hard to Do"	Nick Havinga	Steve Pepoon	October 17, 1988	3002	30.2	18.6/30
Trevor and Raquel have a falling-out, so ALF and Jake try to get them back together. The episode title is based on the Neil Sedaka song.
53	4	"Tonight, Tonight"	Burt Brinckerhoff	Lisa A. Bannick, Steve Pepoon, Al Jean & Michael Reiss	October 24, 1988	3006	30.2	18.5/28
ALF hosts The Tonight Show with Ed McMahon and promotes ALF with clips from Season 2. Frederick de Cordova, Teresa Ganzel, Tommy Newsom, Rich Little, Joan Embrey, Tim Wade, Joyce Brothers and Eugene Greytak (as Pope John Paul II) also appear. Note: This is a one-hour clip show. Josh Blake (Jake Ochmonek) does not appear in this episode. The episode title is based on the Genesis song "Tonight, Tonight, Tonight".
54	5	"Promises, Promises"	Burt Brinckerhoff	Beverly Archer	October 31, 1988	3004	24.2	15.1/24
ALF reveals that Lynn is dating Eddie (Michael Des Barres) to her parents' dismay. Note: John LaMotta (Trevor Ochmonek), Liz Sheridan (Raquel Ochmonek) and Josh Blake (Jake Ochmonek) do not appear in this episode. The episode title is based on the Naked Eyes song.
55	6	"Turkey in the Straw"	Nick Havinga	Tom Patchett & Steve Hollander	November 14, 1988	3008	29.7	18.0/27 18.0/27
55	6	"Turkey in the Straw"	Nick Havinga	Tom Patchett & Steve Hollander	November 15, 1988	3008	30.0	18.0/27 18.0/27
Part 1: The Tanners are invited to a Thanksgiving dinner with the Ochmonek's bizarre relatives. Part 2: ALF must avoid the Alien Task Force when a homeless guy blows the whistle on him. Guest stars: David Ogden Stiers as Flakey Pete, Michael Champion as Sgt. Matt Fox The episode title is based on the American folk song.
56	7	"Changes"	Nick Havinga	Lisa A. Bannick	November 21, 1988	3007	29.9	18.0/28
Kate starts working and then discovers that she is pregnant. Note: The plot device of Kate being pregnant was written to accommodate Anne Schedeen's real-life pregnancy. John LaMotta (Trevor Ochmonek), Liz Sheridan (Raquel Ochmonek) and Josh Blake (Jake Ochmonek) do not appear in this episode. The episode title is based on the David Bowie song.
57	8	"My Back Pages"	Burt Brinckerhoff	Ron Burla	November 28, 1988	3012	24.2	15.6/23
Seeing Willie and Kate reminiscing over their old stuff in the attic and show the family film footage of them attending the Woodstock festival, ALF asks Willie about the 1960s, causing Willie to ponder if he abandoned the ideals he held during those years. Note: Josh Blake (Jake Ochmonek) does not appear in this episode. The episode title is based on the Bob Dylan song.
58	9	"Alone Again, Naturally"	Burt Brinckerhoff	Paul Fusco	December 5, 1988	3013	24.0	15.5/23
ALF mistakenly believes his cousin Blinky is living in Barstow, getting himself captured by a deranged freak show owner. Guest Starring: Kathleen Freeman as Betty Susla and Richard McKenzie as Nick Susla. Note: John LaMotta (Trevor Ochmonek), Liz Sheridan (Raquel Ochmonek) and Josh Blake (Jake Ochmonek) do not appear in this episode. The episode title is based on the Gilbert O'Sullivan song.
59	10	"Do You Believe in Magic?"	Tony Csiki	Scott Spencer Gorden	December 12, 1988	3009	30.9	18.6/28
Willie introduces ALF to simple magic tricks. Note: John LaMotta (Trevor Ochmonek), Liz Sheridan (Raquel Ochmonek) and Josh Blake (Jake Ochmonek) do not appear in this episode. The episode title is based on the Lovin' Spoonful song.
60	11	"Hide Away"	Burt Brinckerhoff	Steve Pepoon	January 9, 1989	3014	28.7	17.6/26
After a verbose houseguest of Willie's reveals he is in the Witness Protection Program, ALF is convinced gangsters are stalking the Tanners. Note: Liz Sheridan (Raquel Ochmonek) and Josh Blake (Jake Ochmonek) do not appear in this episode. The episode title is based on the Freddie King song.
61	12	"Fight Back"	Nick Havinga	Seth Weisbord	January 16, 1989	3016	30.8	18.1/27
When Jake easily repairs Willie's car, he and ALF think the mechanic may be sabotaging the car for needless repeat business, so they start Operation Sam-Scam to furnish proof. Note: Liz Sheridan (Raquel Ochmonek) does not appear in this episode. The episode title is based on a song by either Solomon Burke or Discharge.
62	13	"Suspicious Minds"	Nick Havinga	Al Jean & Michael Reiss	January 23, 1989	3010	34.0	20.4/30
ALF believes that a reclusive new neighbor is Elvis Presley, and is further convinced when the man displays Elvis-like tendencies. Note: John LaMotta (Trevor Ochmonek) and Josh Blake (Jake Ochmonek) do not appear in this episode. The episode title is based on the song popularized by Elvis.
63	14	"Baby Love"	Nick Havinga	Lisa A. Bannick	February 6, 1989	3011	38.9	22.8/32
When Raquel plans a surprise baby shower for Kate, one of the neighbors brings her baby to the party. Meanwhile, ALF has an allergic reaction to a baby and he tries to move in with Jake. Note: John LaMotta (Trevor Ochmonek) does not appear in this episode. The episode title is based on the Supremes song.
64	15	"Running Scared"	Gary Shimokawa	Steve Pepoon	February 13, 1989	3017	30.0	17.8/27
The extortionist Lee Fraser threatens to turn ALF in to the immigration authorities for being an illegal alien. Note: Liz Sheridan (Raquel Ochmonek) and Josh Blake (Jake Ochmonek) do not appear in this episode. The episode title is based on the Roy Orbison song.
65	16	"Standing in the Shadows of Love"	Nick Havinga	David Cohen & Roger S.H. Schulman	February 20, 1989	3015	30.7	18.4/27
Jake has a crush on a girl at school named Laura (Carla Gugino) but cannot express his feelings. ALF, inspired by the story of Cyrano de Bergerac, ghostwrites love letters for Jake. Note: John LaMotta (Trevor Ochmonek) and Liz Sheridan (Raquel Ochmonek) do not appear in this episode. The episode title is based on the Four Tops song.
66	17	"Superstition"	Gary Shimokawa	Steve Pepoon	February 27, 1989	3020	29.1	17.6/26
ALF blames his streak of bad luck on a Melmac superstition of burning a history book. Note: Liz Sheridan (Raquel Ochmonek) does not appear in this episode. The episode title is based on the Stevie Wonder song.
67	18	"Torn Between Two Lovers"	Nick Havinga	Beverly Archer	March 6, 1989	3021	34.2	20.7/30
Thanks to ALF's mismanaged phone calls, Lynn gets two dates with Danny and Randy for a dance. Note: John LaMotta (Trevor Ochmonek), Liz Sheridan (Raquel Ochmonek) and Josh Blake (Jake Ochmonek) do not appear in this episode. The episode title is based on the song popularized by Mary MacGregor.
68	19	"Funeral for a Friend"	Paul Fusco	Scott Spencer Gorden	March 20, 1989	3023	30.0	18.0/28
ALF acquires an ant farm and then arranges a funeral after the ants die. Note: John LaMotta (Trevor Ochmonek), Liz Sheridan (Raquel Ochmonek) and Josh Blake (Jake Ochmonek) do not appear in this episode. The episode title is based on the Elton John song.
69	20	"Don't Be Afraid of the Dark"	Nick Havinga	Alicia Marie Schudt	March 27, 1989	3022	28.0	17.1/27
To prepare Brian for his Boy Scout trip, ALF and Jake camp out to overcome his fear of the outdoors at night. Note: John LaMotta (Trevor Ochmonek) and Liz Sheridan (Raquel Ochmonek) do not appear in this episode. The episode title is based on the Robert Cray song.
70	21	"Have You Seen Your Mother, Baby, Standing in the Shadow?"	Howard Storm	Paul Fusco & Lisa A. Bannick	April 10, 1989	3026	28.1	17.6/28
Jake's mother (Randee Heller) visits him and ALF catches her stealing Kate's brooch. The episode title is based on the Rolling Stones song.
71	22	"Like an Old Time Movie"	Nick Havinga	Nelson Costello	April 17, 1989	3003	22.7	14.7/26
While the Tanners are away and leave some old movies to entertain him, ALF imagines in black and white that he and the Tanners are silent-movie stars. The episode title is based on the Scott McKenzie song.
72	23	"Shake, Rattle and Roll"	Nick Havinga	Ron Burla	May 1, 1989	3018	24.0	14.5/24
After experiencing a mild earthquake, ALF prepares for the worst. Notes: This episode contradicts a scene in the season one episode Mother and Child Reunion, which depicted Alf as not only knowing about Earthquakes and fault lines, but suggesting Willie and Kate pretend an Earthquake is happening in order to scare Dorothy out of the Tanner home. This was also Josh Blake's (Jake Ochmonek) final appearance on the show. The episode title is based on the Big Joe Turner song.
73	24	"Having My Baby"	Nick Havinga	Lisa A. Bannick	May 8, 1989	3019	25.1	15.7/27
ALF re-enacts scenes from The Dick Van Dyke Show, as Kate prepares to give birth. Note: The baby, Eric William Tanner, first appears at the end of the episode. The episode title is based on the Paul Anka song.
