= ALF season 2 =

ALF
- Season 2
- DVD cover
- No. of episodes: 25

Release
- Original network: NBC
- Original release: September 21, 1987 – May 9, 1988

Season chronology
- ← Previous; Season 1 Next → Season 3

The following is a list of episodes from the second season of ALF. Most episode titles are named after popular songs.

== Broadcast history ==
The season aired Mondays at 8:00-8:30 pm (EST) on NBC.

== DVD release ==
The season was released on DVD by Lions Gate Home Entertainment on August 23, 2005.

== Cast ==
- Paul Fusco as ALF (puppeteer, voice)
  - Lisa Buckley as ALF (assistant puppeteer)
  - Bob Fappiano as ALF (assistant puppeteer)
- Max Wright as Willie Tanner
- Anne Schedeen as Kate Tanner
- Andrea Elson as Lynn Tanner
- Benji Gregory as Brian Tanner

== Episodes ==
| No. overall | No. in season | Title | Directed by | Written by | Original release date | Prod. code | Rating/share (households) |
|---|---|---|---|---|---|---|---|
| 26 | 1 | "Working My Way Back to You" | Nick Havinga | Steve Pepoon | September 21, 1987 | 2003 | 17.9/29 |
ALF has to go one week without destroying anything in the Tanners' house. The episode title is based on the Four Seasons song popularized by The Spinners.
| 27 | 2 | "Somewhere Over the Rerun" "The Ballad of Gilligan's Island" | Nick Havinga | Scott Spencer Gorden | September 28, 1987 | 2004 | 20.3/32 |
After becoming addicted to reruns of Gilligan's Island, ALF dreams that he has joined the castaways. Bob Denver, Alan Hale, Jr., Russell Johnson and Dawn Wells appear. The first episode title is based on the Judy Garland song "Over the Rainbow". The second is based on Gilligan's Island theme song The Ballad of Gilligan's Isle.
| 28 | 3 | "Take a Look at Me Now" | Gary Shimokawa | Steve Pepoon | October 5, 1987 | 2006 | 18.5/30 |
Raquel's claim of seeing ALF makes her subject to ridicule and prone to depression, so ALF decides to defend her. The episode title is based on the Phil Collins song "Against All Odds (Take a Look at Me Now)".
| 29 | 4 | "Wedding Bell Blues" | Burt Brinckerhoff | Lisa A. Bannick | October 12, 1987 | 2010 | 19.9/31 |
ALF, after being deeply saddened by the fact that his parents got married before his birth (which is a taboo on Melmac), runs away to a monastery. The episode title is based on the song popularized by the 5th Dimension.
| 30 | 5 | "Prime Time" | Burt Brinckerhoff | Lisa A. Bannick | October 19, 1987 | 2009 | 17.7/27 |
When the Tanners become part of the new Thompson Rating System, ALF rigs the ratings in order to prevent his favorite show, Polka Jamboree, from being cancelled. The episode title is based on any of a number of songs (by Count Basie, Alan Parsons, Haircut One Hundred, or The Tubes).
| 31 | 6 | "Some Enchanted Evening" | Gary Shimokawa | Seth Weisbord | October 26, 1987 | 2005 | 18.5/28 |
Not allowed to go trick-or-treating, ALF attends Willie's Halloween party and tries to convince his boss to give Willie an overdue promotion. The episode title is based on the Rodgers and Hammerstein song.
| 32 | 7 | "Oh, Pretty Woman" | Burt Brinckerhoff | Alicia Marie Schudt | November 2, 1987 | 2001 | 18.2/27 |
Lynn is depressed over being dumped by a boyfriend for a prettier girl, so ALF enters her in a beauty pageant to increase her self-confidence. The episode title is based on the Roy Orbison song.
| 33 | 8 | "Something's Wrong With Me" | Burt Brinckerhoff | Steve Pepoon | November 9, 1987 | 2011 | 18.9/28 |
Dorothy is planning to marry Whizzer, but ALF's Melmacian hiccups put the wedding in jeopardy. Guest star: Paul Dooley as Whizzer The episode title is based on the Austin Roberts song.
| 34 | 9 | "Night Train" | Burt Brinckerhoff | Bob Bendetson | November 16, 1987 | 2013 | 19.7/30 |
Reminiscing his younger and more carefree days when he was known as "Boxcar Willie", Willie takes ALF to the train switchyard where they jump a moving freight train. Guest star: Tracey Walter as Gravel Gus The episode title is based on the Jimmy Forrest song.
| 35 | 10 | "Isn't It Romantic?" | Gary Shimokawa | Seth Weisbord | November 23, 1987 | 2008 | 18.9/29 |
Seeing that Kate and Willie have been arguing of late, ALF and the Tanner children plan to recreate the couple's Niagara Falls honeymoon. The episode title is based on the Rodgers and Hart song.
| 36 | 11 | "Hail to the Chief" | Burt Brinckerhoff | Lisa A. Bannick | December 7, 1987 | 2014 | 17.2/26 |
After watching a presidential debate, Kate has recurring dreams of running against ALF. The episode title is based on the U.S. presidential anthem.
| 37 | 12 | "ALF's Special Christmas" | Burt Brinckerhoff | Steven Hollander | December 14, 1987 | 2040 | 21.1/31 |
ALF and the Tanners prepare to spend Christmas in a cabin. ALF accidentally ends up with a group of toys that is sent to a hospital, where he then befriends a terminally ill little girl (Keri Houlihan) and helps deliver a baby to a young woman (Molly Hagan). Note: Officially, this one-hour special is considered a stand-alone Christmas special independent of the series. In syndication, it was split into a two-part episode and incorporated into the series syndication package. The special is notably the only piece of ALF media outside the series to feature the Tanner family. The special is also shot on film and does not use any sets from the series proper. Guest stars: Cleavon Little as George Foley, Carl Franklin as Dr. Willoughby
| 38 | 13 | "The Boy Next Door" | Burt Brinckerhoff | Al Jean & Michael Reiss | January 4, 1988 | 2015 | 20.4/29 |
ALF befriends Trevor and Raquel's nephew Jake from New York. Note: Josh Blake's (Jake Ochmonek) first appearance on the show. The episode title is based on the Judy Garland song.
| 39 | 14 | "Can I Get a Witness?" | Gary Shimokawa | Nelson Costello | January 11, 1988 | 2007 | 19.8/29 |
ALF is put on trial for breaking the Ochmoneks' window. Note: Josh Blake (Jake Ochmonek) does not appear in this episode. The episode title is based on the Marvin Gaye song.
| 40 | 15 | "We're So Sorry, Uncle Albert" | Nick Havinga | Paul Fusco | January 25, 1988 | 2016 | 17.3/25 |
Willie's Uncle Albert (Elisha Cook) visits the Tanners, and collapses from a heart attack after getting a glimpse of the alien, causing ALF to feel grief thinking he caused the death. Note: John LaMotta (Trevor Ochmonek), Liz Sheridan (Raquel Ochmonek) and Josh Blake (Jake Ochmonek) do not appear in this episode. The episode title is based on the Paul McCartney song "Uncle Albert/Admiral Halsey".
| 41 | 16–17 | "Someone to Watch Over Me" | Gary Shimokawa | Lisa Stotsky & Wendy Graf | February 8, 1988 | 2019 | 19.2/28 |
| 41 | 16–17 | "Someone to Watch Over Me" | Gary Shimokawa | Lisa Stotsky & Wendy Graf | February 15, 1988 | 2020 | 18.6/27 |
Part 1: Willie is chosen by the neighborhood to lead a neighborhood watch. But ALF takes control of the radio and starts to talk as if he was Willie. Part 2: ALF spots a criminal by his neighbor's house, and walks inside to investigate. The episode title is based on the Gershwin song.
| 42 | 18 | "We Gotta Get Out of This Place" | Gary Shimokawa | Marjorie Gross | February 22, 1988 | 2018 | 18.2/27 |
ALF moves in with his blind friend Jody in her condo. Note: John LaMotta (Trevor Ochmonek), Liz Sheridan (Raquel Ochmonek) and Josh Blake (Jake Ochmonek) do not appear in this episode. The episode title is based on the Animals song.
| 43 | 19 | "You Ain't Nothin' But a Hound Dog" | Gary Shimokawa | Scott Spencer Gorden | February 29, 1988 | 2002 | 20.5/32 |
The Tanners take in a stray dog, much to ALF's dismay. (Featuring Anne Ramsey in her last television role) Guest stars: Nicole Dubuc as Hannah, Logan Ramsey as Vince Note: Liz Sheridan (Raquel Ochmonek) and Josh Blake (Jake Ochmonek) do not appear in this episode. The episode title is based on the Big Mama Thornton song popularized by Elvis Presley.
| 44 | 20 | "Hit Me with Your Best Shot" | Gary Shimokawa | Kevin Abbott | March 7, 1988 | 2021 | 18.5/29 |
Willie tries to teach Brian nonviolence in dealing with a school bully, but changes his ways when the bully's lowlife father comes to the Tanner residence and insults the entire family. Note: Josh Blake (Jake Ochmonek) does not appear in this episode. The episode title is based on the Pat Benatar song.
| 45 | 21 | "Movin' Out" | Tony Csiki and Nick Havinga | Alicia Marie Schudt | March 14, 1988 | 2022 | 19.1/29 |
Willie gets a promotion that relocates him to San Diego, however despite hating the new job and proclaiming how much he loves the house they currently live in, it takes drastic moves by ALF to make him realize what he's doing. Note: Josh Blake (Jake Ochmonek) does not appear in this episode. The episode title is based on the Billy Joel song "Movin' Out (Anthony's Song)".
| 46 | 22 | "I'm Your Puppet" | Burt Brinckerhoff | Al Jean & Michael Reiss | March 21, 1988 | 2012 | 19.3/30 |
ALF gets a ventriloquist dummy in the mail that takes control of him. Guest star: Bill Daily as Larry Note: John LaMotta (Trevor Ochmonek), Liz Sheridan (Raquel Ochmonek) and Josh Blake (Jake Ochmonek) do not appear in this episode. The episode title is based on the James & Bobby Purify song.
| 47 | 23 | "Tequila" | Nick Havinga | Story by : Sandy Gillis; Teleplay by : Art Everett | March 28, 1988 | 2023 | 19.4/30 |
ALF plays pink elephant for Kate's alcoholic friend Maura (Dorothy Lyman), and frightens her into getting assistance. Note: John LaMotta (Trevor Ochmonek), Liz Sheridan (Raquel Ochmonek) and Josh Blake (Jake Ochmonek) do not appear in this episode. The episode title is based on the Champs song.
| 48 | 24 | "We Are Family" | Nick Havinga | Steve Pepoon | May 2, 1988 | 2024 | 15.5/27 |
The Tanners plan a party for ALF, who is depressed that he is the only one of his species. Sandy Duncan appears as herself. Guest star: Bill Daily as Larry The episode title is based on the Sister Sledge song.
| 49 | 25 | "Varsity Drag" | Gary Shimokawa | Lisa A. Bannick | May 9, 1988 | 2017 | 16.3/27 |
After realizing that Willie and Kate have emptied Lynn's college fund to support him, a guilty ALF gets ten newspaper routes to earn money for the family. Note: John LaMotta (Trevor Ochmonek) and Josh Blake (Jake Ochmonek) do not appear in this episode. The episode title is based on the song by De Sylva, Brown and Henderson.
