= Weird Science =

Weird Science may refer to:

- Weird Science (film), a 1985 film directed by John Hughes
  - Weird Science (TV series), a television series based on the film
  - "Weird Science" (song), the theme song to the film and the TV series by Oingo Boingo
- Weird Science (comics), a 1950s comic book published by EC Comics
- Weird Science (group), a group consisting of Blake Miller and Steve Aoki
- "Weird Science" (ALF), a 1987 television episode
- "Weird Science" (D:TNG episode), an episode from season two of Degrassi: The Next Generation

== See also ==
- Pseudoscience
- Weerd Science, pseudonym for rapper Josh Eppard (b. 1979)
