= ALF season 1 =

ALF
- Season 1
- DVD cover
- Starring: Max Wright; Anne Schedeen; Andrea Elson; Benji Gregory
- No. of episodes: 25

Release
- Original network: NBC
- Original release: September 22, 1986 – May 11, 1987

Season chronology
- Next → Season 2

The following is a list of episodes from the inaugural season of ALF. Most episode titles are named after popular songs.

== Broadcast history ==
Season One aired Mondays at 8:00-8:30 pm (EST) on NBC.

== DVD release ==
The season was released on DVD by Lionsgate Home Entertainment.

== Cast ==
- Paul Fusco as ALF (puppeteer, voice)
  - Lisa Buckley as ALF (assistant puppeteer)
  - Bob Fappiano as ALF (assistant puppeteer)
- Max Wright as Willie Tanner
- Anne Schedeen as Kate Tanner
- Andrea Elson as Lynn Tanner
- Benji Gregory as Brian Tanner

== Episodes ==
No. overall	No. in season	Title	Directed by	Written by	Original release date	Prod. code	Rating/share (households)
1	1	"A.L.F."	Tom Patchett	Tom Patchett	September 22, 1986	1001	15.6/24
Gordon Shumway, a Melmacian who escaped his planet Melmac before it was destroyed, crash lands into the garage of the Tanner family. The Tanners call him "ALF" because he is an Alien Life Form and they decide to keep his presence a secret so that the U.S. Government will not take away the space being and subject him to experiments.
2	2	"Strangers in the Night"	Peter Bonerz	Paul Fusco & Thad Mumford	September 29, 1986	1004	13.8/21
Everybody but Brian and ALF are leaving the house for the evening. Kate does not want ALF to babysit Brian, so Willie asks their ever-snooping neighbor, Mrs. Ochmonek. ALF is told to stay in the bedroom, but when Mrs. Ochmonek starts to watch Psycho he cannot resist sneaking out of the bedroom to watch. The episode title is based on the song popularized by Frank Sinatra.
3	3	"Looking for Lucky"	Peter Bonerz	Bob Bendetson & Howard Bendetson	October 6, 1986	1006	15.1/23
When Lucky, the Tanners family cat, disappears, ALF is accused of eating him. ALF must search for Lucky to prove his innocence. The episode title is based on the Johnny Lee song "Lookin' for Love".
4	4	"Pennsylvania 6-5000"	Peter Bonerz	Donald Todd	October 13, 1986	1003	14.4/21
After ALF uses the shortwave radio to call the President to express his concern about nuclear weapons, his call is misinterpreted as a threat. Willie gets blamed and is thrown in jail. The episode title is based on the Glenn Miller song.
5	5	"Keepin' the Faith"	Peter Bonerz	Laurie Gelman	October 20, 1986	1008	15.6/23
To solve the Tanners' money problems, ALF gets a job selling make-up. The episode title is based on the Billy Joel song.
6	6	"For Your Eyes Only"	Peter Bonerz	Mitzi McCall & Adrienne Armstrong	November 3, 1986	1005	15.5/23
ALF meets a blind woman named Jody (Andrea Covell). The episode title is based on the Bond movie theme sung by Sheena Easton.
7	7	"Help Me, Rhonda"	Peter Bonerz and Rick Gough	Tom Patchett & Lloyd Garver	November 10, 1986	1010	15.7/23
Brian's 7th birthday is approaching and it gets ALF depressed because he realizes he is never going to see his friends on Melmac again — he was finally going to get together with his true love Rhonda and then the planet exploded. When he falls asleep, ALF dreams about his 228th birthday on Melmac, just before the explosion. In order to cheer ALF up, Brian and Willie start broadcasting into space in hopes of finding another survivor from Melmac. The episode title is based on the Beach Boys song.
8	8	"Don't It Make Your Brown Eyes Blue?"	Tom Patchett	Jerry Stahl	November 17, 1986	1011	21.5/31
Lynn is excited because her boyfriend Scott wants to keep all his band equipment in the Tanners' garage although Willie is not so excited. Lynn is interested in Scott and begs for Willie to allow Scott to keep the equipment in their garage for just two days and Willie gives her his permission. ALF is not happy because he was supposed to be redecorating his room with Lynn. And he also has a crush on Lynn, so he proceeds to sabotage Scott's time with Lynn while trying to come up with something to impress her. He also films a music video for her ("You're the One Who's Out of This World") to prove it. The episode title is based on the Crystal Gayle song "Don't It Make My Brown Eyes Blue".
9	9	"Jump"	Peter Bonerz	Gary Markowitz	November 24, 1986	1009	13.8/20
For Willie's birthday, ALF gives him a box he found in the basement full of photos from high school and college. There is also a menu, on the back of which Kate and Willie both made lists of things they wanted to achieve in life. Kate actually did the things on her list, but Willie did not. This starts to haunt him so badly that he decides to do the list. Guest star: Joe Namath as himself The episode title is based on the Van Halen song.
10	10	"Baby, You Can Drive My Car"	Nancy Heydorn	Thad Mumford & Laurie Gelman	December 1, 1986	1013	15.1/22
ALF buys a car for Lynn after the family car continues to be unreliable. Guest star: Robert Costanzo as Tow truck driver Bert The episode title is based on the Beatles song "Drive My Car".
11	11	"On the Road Again"	Peter Bonerz	Bob Bendetson & Howard Bendetson	December 8, 1986	1002	15.9/24
Willie suggests that they go to San Diego on vacation. Kate is all for it, but the family is unsure what to do with ALF. ALF starts a kitchen fire, and the Tanners realize leaving ALF alone is a recipe for disaster. Brian suggests going deep into the woods where the Melmacian alien won't be seen, and the family decides to go camping, and takes ALF along for the road trip. However, ALF drives the RV into the forest and the weather turns stormy. In the RV, ALF causes chaos as Willie is trying to be positive. This leads to Willie getting upset and telling ALF to leave and ALF wanders into a cabin nearby. Two guys who live in the cabin discover the alien and believe he is an anteater and attempt to butcher him. One of the guys discovers that ALF can talk and then Willie comes by to rescue the alien. The episode ends in the living room where ALF is showing pictures of the family vacation to Lucky. The episode title is based on the Willie Nelson song.
12	12	"Oh, Tannerbaum"	Rick Gough	Donald Todd	December 22, 1986	1012	15.4/25
ALF spends his first Christmas on Earth. ALF cuts the Tanners Christmas tree into firewood and Willie tries to find another tree. However, the only tree he can find is a lifelike simulated tree, but proves to be underwhelming to the family and ALF. ALF and Willie decide to go to a real tree forest to cut down a Christmas tree. However, the car breaks down in the forest and they get stuck. Willie has a dream where ALF comes in and tells Kate that the tree is a fake. Willie wakes up and realizes ALF cut a tree and put it in the car. The episode title is based on the German Christmas song "O Tannenbaum".
13	13	"Mother and Child Reunion"	Tom Patchett	Bob Bendetson & Howard Bendetson	January 12, 1987	1014	18.1/26
Kate's mother Dorothy (Anne Meara), who is not on warm terms with Kate, arrives for a surprise visit that forces the Tanners to lock ALF in the garage for several days. The problem is that ALF cannot stand being not allowed to roam around in the house, with all the luxuries found there. So, Kate and Willie decide to introduce Dorothy and ALF. The episode title is based on the Paul Simon song.
14	14	"A Little Bit of Soap"	Tom Patchett	Laurie Gelman	January 19, 1987	1015	18.4/25
Dorothy thinks ALF's favorite TV soap opera, Midwest General, is sleaze, and shows him her favorite, One World to Hope For, which ALF thinks is boring. Angered, ALF argues that he could write a better script for the series than the writers are coming up with. So ALF actually writes a script and sends it in. Guest star: Robert Pine as Father The episode title is based on the song first recorded by the Jarmels.
15	15	"I've Got a New Attitude"	Nancy Heydorn	Thad Mumford	February 2, 1987	1017	15.1/23
ALF plays matchmaker with Dorothy and her new boyfriend Whizzer. The episode title is based on the Patti LaBelle song "New Attitude".
16	16	"Try to Remember"	Tom Patchett	Laurie Gelman, Bob Bendetson, Howard Bendetson & Donald Todd	February 9, 1987	1023	17.3/25
ALF loses his memory and thinks he is insurance agent Wayne Schlegel after accidentally electrocuting himself in the bathtub. The Tanners then use flashbacks to restore his memory. Note: This is a one-hour clip show; later edits changed the cause of ALF's memory loss from electric shock to a head injury after NBC received complaints from viewers. The episode title is based on the song from the stage play and movie The Fantasticks.
17	17	"Border Song"	Tom Patchett	Donald Todd	February 16, 1987	1016	18.2/25
ALF befriends a Mexican teenage immigrant who wants to go back home. Guest star: Earl Boen as Warren The episode title is based on the Elton John song.
18	18	"Wild Thing"	Nancy Heydorn	David Silverman & Stephen Sustarsic	March 2, 1987	1018	18.3/27
ALF, beginning to go through a Melmacian psychological and physiological transformation which happens every 75 years for Melmacians on March 2nd, warns the Tanner family that he must be locked up for 24 hours during this period in which he will experience wild, erratic behavior — but he escapes before the day is over. The episode title is based on the Troggs song.
19	19	"Going Out of My Head Over You"	Nancy Heydorn	Bob Bendetson & Howard Bendetson	March 16, 1987	1019	17.0/25
Tired of lying to keep ALF a secret to others, Willie goes to see a therapist. Guest star: Bill Daily as Dr. Lawrence 'Larry' Dykstra; Jack Riley as his patient The episode title is based on the Little Anthony and the Imperials song "Goin' Out of My Head".
20	20	"Lookin' Through the Windows"	Nancy Heydorn	Bob Bendetson	March 23, 1987	1021	17.2/26
During a power outage, ALF believes that Raquel was murdered by Trevor when he watches them have arguments through their windows. Guest star: Bill McIntyre as Officer The episode title is based on the Jackson 5 song.
21	21	"It's Not Easy Bein' Green"	Peter Bonerz	Wendy Graf & Lisa Stotsky	March 30, 1987	1007	18.5/26
Brian must perform a song about asparagus for the school play, but is too nervous. Guest star: Marcia Wallace as Mrs. Lyman The episode title is based on the song sung by Jim Henson as Kermit the Frog.
22	22	"The Gambler"	Gary Shimokawa	Thad Mumford & Laurie Gelman	April 6, 1987	1022	17.0/26
The Tanners are preparing for a garage sale to get some money for house payments. ALF discovers the alluring world of horse racing thanks to Kate's mom who bets on them. When the concept of a bookie is explained to ALF, he gets the bright idea of getting the Tanners some money through betting. When his initial bets yield only profit, the plan seems good. Guest star: David Leisure as Nick "The Fish" Mintz The episode title is based on the song popularized by Kenny Rogers.
23	23	"Weird Science"	Paul Fusco	Paul Fusco	April 13, 1987	1020	17.4/28
When the living room television breaks down, Willie declares that he will not have it fixed, despite ALF's complaints that he has nothing to do but watch television. In the meantime, Brian announces that he needs to come up with a project for the Science Carnival. On his own, Brian creates a model of the Solar System. ALF points out that there are inaccuracies and offers to help. He tells Brian that there are two more planets named Dave and Alvin. The episode title is based on the Oingo Boingo song popularized by the movie of the same name.
24	24	"La Cucaracha"	Peter Baldwin	Jerry Stahl	May 4, 1987	1025	16.4/26
A cockroach from ALF's spaceship grows to gigantic proportions. The episode title is based on the Mexican folk song.
25	25	"Come Fly With Me"	Peter Baldwin	Nelson Costello	May 11, 1987	1024	14.1/25
ALF gives The Tanners a real estate promotion for a sales pitch and Willie opposes the idea of going on vacation and leaving ALF at home when Trevor Ochmonek offers to take them on his plane. Eventually, he decides to go on vacation with the Ochmoneks and leaves ALF at home, but ALF sneaks into the luggage and shocks Willie when the alien surprises the Tanners at the hotel. ALF accidentally burns the hotel room trying to cook catfish in the talking toaster he obtained causing the Tanners and the Ochmoneks to be thrown out of the hotel. Trevor gets an allergic reaction while flying the plane from eating shellfish that Raquel warned him about and passes out where he starts acting loopy. Now the Tanners are in danger and ALF decides to fly the plane and saves the Tanners from danger. The episode title is based on the Frank Sinatra song.
