= Michelle Anthony =

American singer-songwriter

- Born: Michelle Anthony; May 24; Kansas City, Missouri, US
- Genres: Rock, pop
- Occupations: Musician, singer, songwriter
- Instruments: Vocals, bass guitar, piano, keyboard, organ, theremin
- Years active: 1993–present
- Labels: Burn and Shiver, Merctwyn Records
- Website: michelleanthonymusic.com

Michelle Anthony is an American singer-songwriter.

== Biography ==
Michelle Anthony was born in Kansas City, Missouri, and grew up in Overland Park, Kansas (a suburb of Kansas City). She began playing piano by ear at age three, taught by her mother, a piano teacher, and father, a classically trained pianist. She later took up bass guitar to fill a void for the rock band she played with in high school.

She moved to Milwaukee, Wisconsin, to attend Marquette University and remained in Wisconsin after graduating. In college, Anthony aspired to be an agent, facilitating bookings and promotions for other bands. At Marquette she was a member of the band Tempus Fugit.

She moved to Austin, Texas, in 2005 and to Overland Park, Missouri, in 2012.

=== Capital 8 ===
Anthony was a member of the popular Milwaukee rock band Capital 8 (sometimes stylized as "C8") from 1999 to 2004. Capital 8 released two albums, Reason and Payola. Anthony was featured prominently on Payola, and her performance was singled out as one of the highlights of the album.

When Capital 8 disbanded, Anthony formed the band Stick Pony. They eventually became her supporting band when she began her solo career.

=== Stand Fall Repeat ===
Anthony released her debut album Stand Fall Repeat in 2004. It was critically acclaimed, with Anthony acknowledged by Fox News to be "taking off." The album was recorded over nine days in October 2003 in Chicago, Illinois.

The album was co-produced by Jay Bennett (formerly of Wilco), Anthony, and her husband, Scott. Anthony was introduced to Bennett when contributing vocals to West of Rome's album Drunk Tank Decoy and recruited him to collaborate on her debut album. Anthony was also featured on Bennett's album, The Beloved Enemy.

In October 2004, Anthony was featured on National Public Radio's Mountain Stage in support of the album, also featuring KD Lang and Bruce Cockburn.

=== frozenstarpalace ===
Anthony released her sophomore record, frozenstarpalace, in October 2006.

=== Tornadoes ===
Anthony released her third album, Tornadoes, in August 2010. It was well received by critics. During recording, the working title of the album was Songs from the Old Mill.

She released the instrumental tracks from Tornadoes on her SoundCloud account in 2003.

=== Other music ===
In 2003, Anthony collaborated with Afrodisiac Soundsystem on a trip hop version of the Christmas carol "The First Noel." It was featured on the album Christmas Eclectic.

In 2006, Anthony contributed the song "White Lies" to the compilation album Voices and Faces Project, Vol. 1. It was a benefit album for the Voices and Faces Project, a non-profit whose purpose is to share the stories of survivors of sexual violence with the public.

In 2008, Anthony contributed a cover of the R.E.M. song "You Are The Everything" for the album Undiscovered.

In the winter of 2010, Anthony released the holiday-themed single "Snow."

In 2011, Anthony contributed piano and vocals to The Silos album Florizona.

Anthony also released a demo track in 2011 entitled "Love-Love-Love" for free download on her SoundCloud page.

In 2013, Anthony revealed two previously unreleased tracks from the frozenstarpalace sessions for free download on her SoundCloud page: "Let It Rest" and "Sorry."

Anthony was featured on the 2014 Woolridge Brothers cover album Cover Up. She covered their song "Unbelievable Truth." She later released a stripped-down version of the song on her blog to illustrate the recording process of the song.

=== Featured in ===
Anthony's music is featured in the movie Black Cloud as well as in the television programs The Wonderfalls, Roswell, Pimp My Ride, and Making the Band.

== Personal life ==
Anthony is married to her musical collaborator, Scott Anthony. They met at a party in Kansas City and discovered that they had similar musical tastes and both wanted to start bands. They have two children.

During her first pregnancy, Anthony was diagnosed with HELLP syndrome, which was life-threatening. She credits the ordeal and recovery for giving her clarity and gratitude, which were expressed in part on her Tornadoes album.

== Discography ==
=== Studio albums ===
Title	Album details
Stand Fall Repeat	Release date: August 10, 2004; Label: Burn and Shiver; Formats: CD, MP3
frozenstarpalace	Release date: October 3, 2006; Label: Merctwyn Records; Formats: CD, MP3
Tornadoes	Release date: August 21, 2010; Label: Merctwyn Records; Formats: CD, MP3

=== Compilation albums ===
Title	Album details
Christmas Eclectic	Song: "The First Noel" (with Afrodisiac Soundsystem); Release date: 2003; Label: Burn and Shiver; Formats: CD
Voices and Faces Project, Vol. 1	Song: "White Lies"; Release date: October 31, 2006; Label: Voices & Faces Project; Formats: CD, music download
Undiscovered	Song: "You Are The Everything" (R.E.M. cover); Release date: August 19, 2008; Label: Media Creature Music; Formats: CD, music download
Cover Up	Song: "Unbelievable Truth" (Wooldridge Brothers cover); Release date: July 11, 2014; Label: Wooldridge Brothers; Formats: CD, music download

=== Non-Album singles ===
Title	Album details
"Snow"	Release date: October 7, 2010; Label: Merctwyn; Formats: music download
"Love-Love-Love"	Release date: September 21, 2011; Label: Unreleased; Formats: music download
"Let It Rest"	Release date: March 26, 2013; Label: Unreleased; Formats: music download
"Sorry"	Release date: March 26, 2013; Label: Unreleased; Formats: music download
