= Some Enchanted Evening (disambiguation) =

"Some Enchanted Evening" is a popular song from the musical play South Pacific.

Some Enchanted Evening may also refer to:

== Television ==
- "Some Enchanted Evening" (ALF), a 1987 episode
- "Some Enchanted Evening" (The Simpsons), a 1990 episode
- "Some Enchanted Evening", an episode of Bless This House
- "Some Enchanted Evening", an episode of Last of the Summer Wine
- "Some Enchanted Evening", an episode of Man About the House

== Music ==
- Some Enchanted Evening (Blue Öyster Cult album) (1978)
- Some Enchanted Evening (Art Garfunkel album) (2007)
- Some Enchanted Evening, Bryn Terfel album (2007)
