= The Almost Royal Family =

- ABC Afterschool Special episode
- Episode no.: Season 13; Episode 3
- Directed by: Claude Kerven
- Written by: Jeffrey Kindley
- Based on: Meanwhile, Back At the Castle by Hope Campbell
- Original air date: October 24, 1984

"The Almost Royal Family" is a 1984 episode of the American television anthology series ABC Afterschool Special, which aired on October 24, 1984. The episode was based on the 1973 novel Meanwhile, Back At the Castle, by Hope Campbell.

== Premise ==
When the Henderson family learn that they have inherited a small island located in the middle of the St. Lawrence Seaway, this does not please some of the younger members of this New York City family, especially the eldest daughter Suzanne, who would rather enjoy another fun "Summer in the city". She idolizes Diana, Princess of Wales and wishes for a life of royalty. That wish is about to come true when, while attempting to buy supplies at a US general store, they learn that the island is the subject of a border dispute between the United States and Canada. Suzanne, miffed that the family just became part of a political issue between the two countries, decide to solve the problem: by suggesting that the family declare their independence... from both the US and Canada! The implications causes the family to face a lot more than just their nationality.

== Production notes ==
- Although the novel was set in the 1960s and had a satirical tone, it was modified to match the present day (Princess Diana at the time) and most of the political views were kept to a minimum.
- In some scenes, the island described in the TV adaptation is actually located in the Thousand Islands region that borders the New York and Ontario, but used fake maps to fictionalize the dispute.
- After its initial airing on ABC, it had multiple showings on HBO, Showtime and the Disney Channel.

== Cast ==
- Sarah Jessica Parker as Suzanne Henderson
- Christine Langner as Natalie Johnson
- John Femia as Sam Henderson
- Mary Elaine Monti as Helen Henderson
- Garrett M. Brown as John Henderson
- Frederick Koehler as Jimmy Henderson
- Christopher Curry as Surveyor
- David Babcock as Jim Ross
- Freda Foh Shen as Lynn Watson
- Dan Crane as Russell Jensen
- Daniel Lambert as Lucien Dore
