= Christopher Curry (actor) =

American character actor (born 1948)

- Born: Christopher Root; October 22, 1948 (age 77); Grand Rapids, Michigan, U.S.
- Occupation: Actor
- Years active: 1974–present

Christopher Curry (born Christopher Root; October 22, 1948) is an American character actor of film and television who has appeared in more than 70 films and television programs since the 1980s. His best-known roles are as Captain Bosch in C.H.U.D. and Rico's father in Starship Troopers. He also had a small role in Red Dragon, and appeared as FBI Agent Stuckey in Home Alone 3. From 2011 until 2015, he portrayed the recurring role of Earl Kinsella, the father of Wade Kinsella in the CW TV series Hart of Dixie.

== Filmography ==
Year	Title	Role	Notes
1981	The Pursuit of D. B. Cooper	Hippie	
1984	C.H.U.D.	Captain Bosch	
1984	ABC Afterschool Special	Surveyor	Episode: The Almost Royal Family
1986	F/X	Mitchell	
1988	Too Young the Hero	Laslo	TV movie
1988	The Laser Man	Officer	
1989	See You in the Morning	Larry's Brother	
1989	Last Exit to Brooklyn	Riot Police Officer	
1989	Cross of Fire	Hollings William Jennings Bryan	TV movie
1990	Hunter	Pete Florino	2 episodes
1990	thirtysomething	Dr. Eilerton	Episode: "Life Class"
1990	Desperate Hours	Chabon	
1990	The Return of Superfly	Tom Perkins	
1991	Guns of Paradise	Tuck Sweeney	Episode: "Bad Blood"
1991	The Boys	Policeman #1	TV movie
1991	Palace Guard		Episode: "House Arrest"
1992	Reasonable Doubts	Dr. Bruner	Episode: "Home to Roost"
1992	Quantum Leap	Mr. Takin	Episode: "Trilogy (Part 2) – For Your Love"
1993	L.A. Law	Brian McAlister	Episode: "That's Why the Lady Is a Stamp"
1994	Betrayed by Love	Capt. Stevenson	TV movie
1994	Wings	Bobby Young	Episode: "Moonlighting"
1994	In the Heat of the Night	Bitsy Mergere	Episode: "Poor Relations"
1994	Chicago Hope	Special Agent Tom Jerryman	Episode: "Genevieve and Fat Boy"
1995	Bye Bye Love	Dad #1 at McDonald's	
1995	Babylon 5	Ronald Quantrell	Episode: "And Now For a Word"
1995	Bushwhacked	Trooper	
1995	The Client	Dan Jacobs	Episode: "Dear Harris"
1995	Murder, She Wrote	Sheriff Mike Chubb	Episode: "Frozen Stiff"
1996	JAG	Captain Dykstra	Two Episodes
1997	Dave's World	Kruger	Episode: The Creeping Peril
1997	Johnny Bravo	Man on Street / Guy #2	Voice, 2 episodes
1997	Starship Troopers	Mr. Rico	
1997	Chicago Hope	Jim Dolan	Episode: "All in the Family"
1997	Home Alone 3	FBI Agent Albert Stuckey	
1997	Beverly Hills, 90210	Jerry Wester	2 episodes
1997	Matchbox Circus Train	Frank Sanders	
1998	Bulworth	Journalist	
1999	Love American Style	Daddy	Segment: "Love In The Old South"
1999	Star Trek: Voyager	Automobile Driver	Episode: "11:59"
2001	Summoning	Sam	Short
2001	The Song of the Lark	Fritz Kohler	TV movie
2001	Taking Back Our Town	Walt Haney	TV movie
2001	Crossing Jordan	Jimm Keller	Episode: "Blue Christmas"
2002	The West Wing	Colonel Lee	Episode: "We Killed Yamamoto"
2002	City of Ghosts	Larry Luckman	
2002	Red Dragon	Mr. Fisk	
2003	Dirt	Vice consul	
2003	Alias	Heinz Brucker	Episode: "Truth Takes Time"
2003	The Lyon's Den	Attorney / Zach's Attorney	2 episodes
2003	Medal of Honor: Rising Sun	Michael Paul Floyd (OSS)	Voice, Video Game
2004	Patients	Murray	TV movie
2004	Shelter	Robert	Short
2005	Lincoln's Eyes		Voice, Short
2005	Psychic Driving	Dr. Leonard Mahler	Short
2005	Ultimate Spider-Man		Voice, Video Game
2006	Huff	Matt Stewart	3 episodes
2006	Hitman: Blood Money	Operahouse Tourist / U.S. Guards	Voice, Video Game
2006	Mystery Woman: Oh Baby	Jackson Chandler	TV movie
2006	Flags of Our Fathers	Ed Block	
2007	General Hospital: Night Shift	Jared's Father	2 episodes
2008	Without a Trace	Joel Kemper	Episode: "Article 32"
2008	Crazy	Dr. Taylor	
2008	The Rise of the Argonauts		Voice, Video Game
2008	Young Person's Guide to History	King George III	1 episode
2009	Transformers: Revenge of the Fallen	Pundit #2	
2010	Amish Grace	Minister	TV movie
2010	Days of Our Lives	Elevator Man	Voice, 1 episode
2010	The Young and the Restless	Russ Curtis	3 episodes
2011	Claustrophobia	Orwell	
2011	Rizzoli & Isles	Judge Martin	Episode: "Can I Get a Witness?"
2011-2014	Hart of Dixie	Crazy Earl / Earl Kinsella	13 episodes
2012	BlackBoxTV	Doctor Bannister	Episode: "AEZP: The Hollow"
2013	Jobs	Board Member #1	
2013	Castle	Gaston	Episode: "Hunt"
2013	Glee	Gunther	2 episodes
2014	SpaceBear	Perplexulo, Dream Trout	Voice, TV movie
2016	Sully	Rob Kolodjay	
