= The Fighting Season =

American television documentary series

The Fighting Season is an American docuseries about the war in Afghanistan produced by Ricky Schroder Productions.

The six episode series was picked up by DirecTV for a premiere on 19 May 2015. The series appeared on DirecTVs original channel, Audience. The series has multiple storylines following American units under the command of Lieutenant General Joe Anderson and the 18th Airborne Corps. Anderson is the last American Commander of combat operations in Afghanistan.

As the U.S. contribution to the war winds down and a pivotal election looms—the first free democratic election in Afghanistan's history—the Afghan Army and the remaining Coalition Forces battle to secure the nation.

The show presented unprecedented access to both senior leaders and frontline soldiers.

== Storylines ==
The Fighting Season follows three main storylines:

Coalition forces assist the Kabul police force in securing the capital.

In the Afghan countryside, pockets of insurgents hide among the rural population. Task Force Spartans of the 10th Mountain Division must track down and eliminate Taliban who launch rocket attacks against their forward operating base, and assist the Afghan army as they attempt to clear out a long-standing Taliban stronghold: the Tangi Valley.

Task Force White Devil of the 82nd Airborne is tasked with capturing or killing a high-ranking Taliban Leader, code named Arctic Fox. Arctic Fox oversees the flow of weapons and fighters over the border from Pakistan present. The White Devils work from a high mountain pass near the Pakistan border to a Taliban-infested village, where the insurgents make a stand.

The Fighting Season is the first comprehensive look at what ending a war looks like.
