= Calvin Graham =

United States Navy sailor (1930-1992)

Calvin Leon Graham
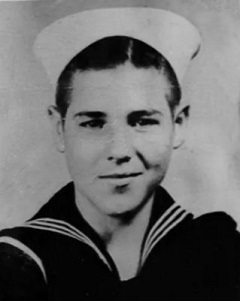
- Seaman First Class Calvin Graham in 1947
- Born: April 3, 1930; Canton, Texas, US
- Died: November 6, 1992 (aged 62); Fort Worth, Texas, US
- Military career
- Allegiance: United States
- Branch: United States Navy; United States Marine Corps
- Service years: 1942–1943; 1948–1951
- Rank: Seaman First Class – USN; Corporal – USMC
- Units: USS South Dakota
- Conflicts: World War II: Battle of Santa Cruz; Naval Battle of Guadalcanal; Korean War
- Awards: Bronze Star Medal (W/"V" Device); Purple Heart

Calvin Leon Graham (April 3, 1930 – November 6, 1992) was the youngest U.S. serviceman to serve and fight during World War II and was one of the few known child soldiers to fight on behalf of the United States in the conflict. Following the attack on Pearl Harbor, he enlisted in the United States Navy from Houston, Texas on August 15, 1942, at the age of 12. His case was similar to that of Jack W. Hill, another child soldier who covertly enlisted during the U.S. involvement in WW2.

== Early life ==
Graham was born in Canton, Texas, and was attending elementary school in Houston before he decided to join the Navy, after his father had died and his mother had remarried.

== US Navy, World War II ==
Graham enlisted in the Navy on August 15, 1942. He went through boot camp in San Diego, California for six weeks. He was deployed to the USS South Dakota, at Pearl Harbor in Oahu, Hawaii.

=== USS South Dakota ===
On October 26, 1942, he saw action in the Battle of the Santa Cruz. The South Dakota and her crew received a Navy Unit Commendation for their service. On the night of November 14–15, 1942, Graham was wounded during the Naval Battle of Guadalcanal. He served as a loader for a 40 mm anti-aircraft gun and was hit by shrapnel while taking a hand message to an officer. Though he received fragmentation wounds, he helped in rescue duty by aiding and pulling the wounded aboard ship to safety. He was then awarded the Bronze Star Medal and the Purple Heart, and he and his crew mates were awarded another Navy Unit Commendation.

The South Dakota returned to the East Coast on December 18, 1942, for an overhaul and battle damage repairs (she had taken 42 hits from at least three enemy ships) in New York City, and since then, was named "Battleship X" in order to make the Japanese think she had been sunk. Graham's mother revealed his age after he traveled to his grandmother's funeral in Texas (he arrived a day late) without permission from the Navy, for which he spent three months in a Texas brig. He was released after his sister threatened to contact the newspapers. Although he had tried to return to his ship, he was discharged from the Navy on April 1, 1943, and his awards were revoked. The South Dakota's gunnery officer who was involved in handling his case was Sargent Shriver.

He then worked in a Houston shipyard as a welder after dropping out of school. At age 14 he married and became a father the following year. At age 17 he was divorced when he enlisted in the Marine Corps.

== US Marine Corps, 1948–1951 ==
Graham joined the United States Marine Corps in 1948 at age 17. His enlistment in the Marines also ended early when he fell from a pier and broke his back in 1951 during the Korean War. Although serving in the Marine Corps qualified him as a veteran, he would spend the rest of his life fighting for full medical benefits and clearing his military service record.

== Post military service ==
In 1978, Graham was finally given an honorable discharge for his service in the Navy, and after writing to Congress and with the approval of President Jimmy Carter, all medals except his Purple Heart were reinstated. His story came to public attention in 1988, when his story was told in the TV movie, Too Young the Hero starring Rick Schroder.

In 1988, Graham received disability benefits and back pay for his service in the Navy after President Ronald Reagan signed legislation that granted Graham full disability benefits, increased his back pay to $4,917 and allowed him $18,000 for past medical bills, contingent on receipts for the medical services. By this time, some of the doctors who treated him had died and many medical bills were lost. He received only $2,100 of the possible $18,000. While the money for the rights to his story for the movie, Too Young The Hero amounted to $50,000, 50% went to two agents and 20% went to a writer of an unpublished book about Graham. He and his wife received just $15,000 before taxes.

=== Death ===
Graham died of heart failure in 1992 at the age of 62. His Purple Heart was finally reinstated, and presented to his widow, Mary, on June 21, 1994, by Secretary of the Navy John Dalton in Arlington, Texas, nearly two years after his death. He was buried at Laurel Land Memorial Park in Fort Worth, Texas.

== Military awards ==
Graham's decorations and military awards, as finally settled circa 1994 after intervention by Presidents Jimmy Carter, Ronald Reagan, and Bill Clinton:

1st Row	Bronze Star with Combat "V"		
2nd Row	Purple Heart	Navy Unit Commendation with service star	American Campaign Medal
3rd Row	Asiatic-Pacific Campaign Medal with two service stars	World War II Victory Medal	National Defense Service Medal
4th Row	Korean Service Medal	United Nations Service Medal	Republic of Korea War Service Medal
