= Class Cruise =

1989 American television film

- Genre: Comedy
- Written by: Steven Long Mitchell; Craig W. Van Sickle
- Directed by: Oz Scott
- Starring: Billy Warlock; Michael DeLuise
- Theme music composer: Mark Davis
- Country of origin: United States
- Original language: English

Production
- Executive producer: Larry A. Thompson
- Producer: Ervin Zavada
- Editor: Michael J. Sheridan
- Running time: 95 minutes
- Production companies: Portoangelo Productions; Larry Thompson Entertainment; Republic Pictures

Original release
- Network: NBC
- Release: October 22, 1989

Class Cruise is an American teen comedy television film that premiered on NBC on October 22, 1989. The film was directed by Oz Scott and written by Steven Long Mitchell and Craig W. Van Sickle.

== Plot ==
A group of Mensa high school students are rewarded for their academic efforts by going on a 14-week ocean cruise. However, the students encounter another group of students who are known for their unruly behavior. The two groups clash due to their different academic and social classes.

== Cast ==
- Jane Carr as Ms. Fagle
- Michael DeLuise as Boz Crenshaw
- Andrea Elson as Staci Poston
- Shelley Fabares as Ellen Poston
- Richard Moll as Saunders
- Marc Price as Arnold Guy
- McLean Stevenson as Miles Gimrich
- Brooke Theiss as Kim Robbins
- Ray Walston as Cappy Connors
- Billy Warlock as Sam McBride
- Frances Bay as Grandma
- Jordan Brady as Randy
- Kathryn Marcopulos as Bev Bunns
- Gigi as Bikini Babe
