= Frankenstein: The College Years =

1991 American comedy film

- Screenplay by: Bryant Christ; John Trevor Wolff
- Directed by: Tom Shadyac
- Starring: William Ragsdale; Christopher Daniel Barnes; Larry Miller
- Theme music composer: Joel McNeely
- Country of origin: United States
- Original language: English

Production
- Producer: Bob Engelman
- Cinematography: Steve Confer
- Editor: David Garfield
- Running time: 100 minutes
- Production companies: FNM Films; Spirit

Original release
- Network: Fox Broadcasting Company
- Release: October 28, 1991

Frankenstein: The College Years is a 1991 American television film directed by Tom Shadyac. It debuted on American television on Fox on Monday, October 28, 1991.

== Plot ==
Pre-med college student Mark Chrisman (William Ragsdale) finds out that his recently deceased mentor Professor Lippzigger (Robert V. Barron) had discovered and retained Victor von Frankenstein's monster. Chrisman, and his more dubious roommate Jay Butterman (Christopher Daniel Barnes), decide to revive the monster. Lacking a place to hide the reanimated creature, he becomes college student Frank N. Stein. Stein becomes a hit on campus and a star of the football team.

== Background ==
The 6' 11' Vincent Hammond was cast as Frankenstein because he was with the group doing special effects for the film, and his tall and imposing appearance was noticed; he had previously played an alien in 1990s' Predator 2 the same way. Hammond was building sets for the film when he was drafted to play the monster under a "special ability" clause in his contract, and was already an extra, so did not sign any contract or join the Screen Actors Guild for the role. William Ragsdale, who plays one of two college students who revives the monster, thought the film would be a major motion picture and not a Fox television movie when he auditioned. When shooting wrapped, Fox asked him to star in their new sitcom Herman's Head, which ended up running for three seasons.

The film was Tom Shadyac's directorial debut. Shadyac went on to direct Ace Ventura: Pet Detective (1994) and many other successful comedy movies. The screenplay was by Bryant Christ and John Trevor Wolff, and is the only IMDb writing credit for either of them.

== Reception ==
Reviews of the movie were mixed, with those expecting a silly TV comedy about Frankenstein's monster being in college, as promised in the title, got what they were promised. Those somehow expecting more of the still growing Fox network (which did not broadcast seven nights a week until the 1993–94 TV season), were less impressed. Mike Hughes of Gannett News Service called the movie "mild, but has some funny moments, particularly from Larry Miller in support. Dan Taylor of Santa Rosa Press Democrat found it "not original", but "lots of fun" and "charming". Mark Dawidziak of the Akron Beacon Journal was harsher, calling it "frightening, all right – frighteningly bad" – "This is Munsters material put through the Ferris Bueller shredder." And Ken Tucker of Entertainment Weekly gave the movie a D+ rating, calling it a "teen exploitation film without a good exploitation film’s gratuitous skin or energetic vulgarity."

In 2014, Canadian film critic Richard Crouse's rundown of prior Frankenstein movies while reviewing I, Frankenstein (2014) called the movie "basically an unlikely mix of Shelley’s story and Encino Man.

The show did not perform well in the weekly Nielsen ratings for its October 28, 1991 premiere. It ranked 88 out of 95 shows for the week, with a 6.1 rating.

Foreign-language dubbed versions of the movie include the following titles: "Frankenstein, le tombeur de la fac" (French), "Partytime mit Frankenstein" (German), "Il mio amico Frank" (Italian), and both "Frankenstein en la universidad" and "Mi amigo Frank" in Spanish.

== Cast ==
- William Ragsdale as Mark Chrisman
- Christopher Daniel Barnes as Jay Butterman
- Larry Miller as Prof. Loman
- Andrea Elson as Andi Richmond
- De'voreaux White as Kingston Sebuka
- Patrick Richwood as Blaine
- Charles Brown as Coach
- Macon McCalman as Dean March
- Margaret Langrick as Gretchen
- Beau Drewman as Wolf
- Robert V. Barron as Prof. Lippzigger
- Vincent Hammond as Frank N. Stein
- Richard Clements as Rutter
- Greg Grunberg as Koslowski
- Joe Farago as Anchorman
- Jason Edwards as Security Officer
- Karl Bakke as Quarterback
