= Beverly Hills Teens =

American animated children's television series

- Developed by: Jack Olesker; Michael Maliani; Barry O'Brien
- Directed by: Craig Zukowski
- Composers: Haim Saban; Shuki Levy
- Countries of origin: United States; Canada
- Original language: English
- No. of seasons: 1
- No. of episodes: 65 (list of episodes)

Production
- Executive producer: Andy Heyward
- Running time: 30 minutes
- Production company: DIC Animation City

Original release
- Network: Syndication
- Release: September 21 – December 18, 1987

Related
- Maxie's World

Beverly Hills Teens is an animated children's television program produced by DIC Animation City. The series consists of one extended season, comprising 65 total episodes, each 30 minutes long, originally airing in first-run syndication in the United States from September 21 to December 18, 1987. After its initial run, the series continued to be broadcast as part of a syndication package featuring rebroadcasts of Maxie's World and It's Punky Brewster, and subsequently acquired the retronym Beverly Hills Teen Club.

Developed by Jack Olesker, Michael Maliani and Barry O'Brien, and executive produced by Andy Heyward, the series' namesake teenagers reside in the exclusive enclave of Beverly Hills, California, and are shown to have exaggerated wealth, exemplified by mansions, yachts, and limousines, while navigating typical teenage concerns, including schoolwork, friendships, and romantic rivalries. The show was nominated for "Best Animated Series" at the 10th Youth in Film Awards (now known as the Young Artist Award).

== Premise ==
The series takes place in Beverly Hills, California, and follows a fictional "Teen Club", consisting of a group of wealthy teenagers, shown to be approximately sixteen years old. Common settings include the teens' palatial high school, the country club, the local salon and spa, and the shopping thoroughfare on Rodeo Drive. The lead protagonist is Larke, a blonde-haired, blue-eyed high school student and fashion model who is shown to be kind and generous to her friends. Her romantic lead is handsome heartthrob Troy, who, like Larke, is shown to be genial and likable, and is often the object of affection for the other girls.

Providing much of the series' conflict is raven-haired beauty, Bianca, who views Larke as her primary rival for everything from the lead in the high school play, to the title of Homecoming Queen, and, most importantly, Troy's affections. Sharing her disdain for the perfect coupling is Pierce, an effeminate and narcissistic boy who presents himself as a "ladies' man", but resents Troy's relationship with Larke. Storylines frequently involve Bianca or Pierce, or sometimes both working together, plotting and/or manipulating events in an attempt to sabotage Larke and Troy's romance, as well as various other relationships within the Teen Club.

The other girls of the Teen Club include rocker girl Jett, cowgirl Blaze, aspiring actress Nikki, southern belle Tara, Teen Club President Shanelle, and gossip columnist Switchboard. The other boys of the Teen Club include rocker boy Gig, surfer boy Radley, self-promoter Buck Huckster, and Bianca's chauffeur Wilshire. In addition to their peer group, the teens are often accompanied by two youngsters, boy genius Chester and Pierce's little sister Jillian, while the rivalry between Larke's cat "Tiara" and Bianca's poodle "Empress" frequently provides the series with its more traditional slapstick comedy elements.

== Cast ==
- Michael Beattie as Wilshire Brentwood / Buck Huckster
- Karen Bernstein as Tara Belle / Jett Lyman
- Tracey Moore / Terri Hawkes (some episodes) as Bianca Dupree / Blaze Summers / Jillian Thorndyke
- Hadley Kay as Gig's guitar / Radley Coleman
- Corrine Koslo as Nikki Darling
- Mary Long as Larke Tanner / Empress
- Stephen McMulkin as Pierce Thorndyke III
- Jonathan Potts as Troy Jeffries
- Sean Roberge as Chester McTech
- Mark Saunders as Thomas "Gig" Josephson / Pierce Thorndyke Jr. (Jillian & Pierce's dad)
- Joanna Schellenberg as Brenda "Switchboard" Andes
- Linda Sorenson as Fifi
- Michelle St. John as Shanelle Spencer

== Episodes ==
No.	Title	Written by	Original release date
1	"Double-Surfing Double-Cross"	Jack Mendelsohn	September 21, 1987
The Teen Club competes in pairs for the "Double Surfing Contest", while Bianca and Pierce both attempt to sabotage Larke and Troy's pairing.
2	"The Dog Ate My Homework"	Mike O'Mahony	September 22, 1987
Bianca plots for Larke to stay at home doing homework instead of attending "The Midnight Ball" and being crowned "Princess" of the festivities.
3	"The Makeover"	Jody Miles Connor	September 23, 1987
After Troy is elected Homecoming King, Larke and Bianca decide to spend a day at Fifi's spa before competing to be Homecoming Queen.
4	"My Fair Wilshire"	Steven J. Fisher	September 24, 1987
Upon witnessing Bianca's mistreatment of Wilshire, the Teen Club decides to try to help Wilshire impress Bianca by giving him a makeover.
5	"Robot Romance"	Tony L. Marino	September 25, 1987
When Chester finds himself without a date to the "Spring Fling" dance, he designs his animatronic dream girl to be his escort for the evening.
6	"Casting Call"	Mike O'Mahony	September 28, 1987
Every girl in Beverly Hills wants to audition when Buck Huckster plans a production of Romeo and Juliet for the high school "Dramatic Society".
7	"Down & Out in the Teenclub"	Steven J. Fisher	September 29, 1987
Tara believes she has been left penniless after a long-lost relative mysteriously appears and claims to be the rightful heir to the family fortune.
8	"Chase of a Lifetime"	John Vornholt; Steve Robertson	September 30, 1987
The girls all compete to capture Troy as their date when Bianca comes up with the idea to hold a Sadie Hawkins dance at the Teen Club.
9	"Downhill Racer"	Alan Swayze	October 1, 1987
Larke and Bianca compete in a series of winter games in hopes of being crowned "Snow Queen" of the Teen Club's annual winter carnival.
10	"Radley Wipes Out"	Coslough Johnson	October 2, 1987
Larke and Shanelle help Radley study for a history test in order for him to remain eligible to compete in the high school surfing championship.
11	"Shipwrecked"	Troy Schmidt; Jeff Holder	October 5, 1987
The Teen Club find themselves lost at sea and stranded on a desert island after an ill-fated voyage on the "S. S. Beverly Hills" cruise ship.
12	"Halloween in the Hills"	Tony L. Marino	October 6, 1987
Bianca is infuriated when both she and Larke show up to the first annual Bianca Dupree Halloween party wearing exactly the same costume.
13	"Visit from a Prince"	Emily Dwass	October 7, 1987
Blaze is the featured cover girl of Teen Magazine and attracts the attention of a prince who wants her to accompany him to a Royal ball.
14	"Camp Camping"	Coslough Johnson	October 8, 1987
During a weekend camping trip, Wilshire feels obligated to leave Bianca and become Pierce's indentured servant after Pierce saves his life.
15	"Dream Date"	Jody Miles Connor	October 9, 1987
The boys all compete when "Teen Scene" sponsors a contest to award the boy who can think of the most creative way to ask Larke for a date.
16	"The Perfect Gift"	John Vornholt; Steve Robertson	October 12, 1987
The girls each buy a birthday gift for Troy, while Bianca sends Wilshire on a mission to find the perfect gift for the boy who has everything.
17	"A Time to Remember"	Calvin Kelly	October 13, 1987
Bianca becomes uncharacteristically kind and generous after a horseback riding accident which causes her to experience a bout of amnesia.
18	"Chester the Matchmaker"	Jim Rogers	October 14, 1987
Tara attempts to attract Radley's attention when Chester invents a computer dating program that determines Radley is her perfect love match.
19	"Who Wears the Pants?"	Jack Enyart	October 15, 1987
A fashion critic mistakes Bianca for a designer when she models a pair of glittering gold jeans designed by Tara for a high school fashion show.
20	"Open for Business"	Jody Miles Connor	October 16, 1987
It is a battle of the sexes when the teens compete in teams of boys versus girls to determine which group has the superior business acumen.
21	"Operation: Soap Opera"	Jim Rogers	October 19, 1987
Bianca is unprepared when she is cast as Nikki's understudy for the lead role in the high school AV club's production of "The Rich Get Richer".
22	"Teenclub Carnival"	Howard Morganstern	October 20, 1987
Jett becomes jealous when she has to work the dunking booth for the Teen Club Charity Carnival while Bianca and Gig spend the day together.
23	"Potions of Love"	Katie Ford	October 21, 1987
Bianca obtains a love potion from Chester in hopes of beguiling Troy into falling in love with her at the Teen Club's Valentine's Day Dance.
24	"The Teen Cup"	John Vornholt; Steve Robertson	October 22, 1987
The teens compete against each other in a yacht race to determine the best mariner, with the winner crowned "King" or "Queen" of the Regatta.
25	"Ghost Story"	Tony L. Marino	October 23, 1987
The Teen Club investigates after Chester discovers the legend of Count de la Mancha whose ghost is said to inhabit the Teen Club Castle.
26	"Fairy Tale Flake Out"	Eric Schaeffer	October 26, 1987
The teens appear as an assortment of legendary fairy tale characters when Bianca slips into a series of daydreams during a literature lecture.
27	"Nothing But The Gossip"	Mike Kirschenbaum	October 27, 1987
Switchboard is faced with an ethical dilemma when she is offered the opportunity to become assistant to celebrity gossip columnist Mona Blabit.
28	"Now We're Cooking"	Joe Glauberg	October 28, 1987
The teens each work to create gourmet delicacies after they are approached to submit recipes for the cook book, "Recipes of the Super Rich".
29	"Old at Heart"	Tony L. Marino	October 29, 1987
Nikki assumes the undercover identity of elderly persona "Flora Belle" after losing the opportunity to portray the role of a senior citizen on stage.
30	"Death Valley 500"	Durnie King	October 30, 1987
The Teen Club faces an underhanded opponent when they compete in the "Death Valley 500" charity auto race to benefit homeless children.
31	"Star Split"	Tony L. Marino	November 2, 1987
Jett tries her hand at a series of different career paths after she and Gig decide to break up their rock group and go their own separate ways.
32	"Double Your Trouble"	Steven J. Fisher	November 3, 1987
Gig has his hands full when he secretly leads both Larke and Tara to believe that they are the exclusive winner of the "Date with Gig" contest.
33	"Take My Hostage, Please!"	Temple Mathews	November 4, 1987
Bianca stages her own kidnapping in an attempt to have Troy rescue her, only to find herself held captive for ransom by a real life kidnapper.
34	"Trouble Times Three"	Emily Dwass	November 5, 1987
Tara recruits Jett and Shanelle to help her babysit when she is called upon to spend the day watching her mischievous identical triplet nephews.
35	"Bianca's Dream"	Sindy McKay; Larry Swerdlove	November 6, 1987
Bianca grows bored with the monotony of the Teen Club and falls into a dream in which everyone is the antithesis of their real life personality.
36	"Pierce's Hundred Dollars"	Jim Rogers	November 9, 1987
Pierce's father challenges him to save $100 from his allowance, promising to award him the world's most luxurious automobile if he succeeds.
37	"Look Deep Into My Eyes"	Calvin Kelly	November 10, 1987
Chester invents a mind control device, prompting Pierce to use it to hypnotize the Teen Club members into electing him the Teen Club "King".
38	"The Commercial"	Mike O'Mahony	November 11, 1987
Larke's cat Tiara is selected to star in a television commercial, prompting Bianca to devise a scheme to have her poodle Empress cast instead.
39	"Hold the Anchovies"	Mike O'Mahony	November 12, 1987
Larke and Bianca lead competing teams for "The Big Whiz Kids Pizza Biz Contest" to win a 40 foot yacht and a week-long vacation in Tahiti.
40	"From Rad to Worse"	Ken Kahn	November 13, 1987
Radley becomes brilliant and arrogant after Chester performs a genius brain transfusion on Radley in an attempt to help him with his homework.
41	"Scene Stealer"	Tony L. Marino	November 16, 1987
Nikki attempts to take center stage when the Teen Club participates in the television program "Lifestyles of the Young and Disgustingly Rich".
42	"A Splitting Image"	Temple Mathews	November 17, 1987
The Teen Club searches for a birthday gift for Pierce, while Chester invents a cloning machine, believing a twin will be Pierce's ideal companion.
43	"Diet, Please"	Tony L. Marino	November 18, 1987
Things get out of hand when Tara embarks on a strict diet/exercise regimen so that she can meet the weight requirement for eligibility in the "Miss Magnolia" beauty contest. This very special episode is followed by a lecture from Larke about the dangers of crash-dieting and over-exercise.
44	"Jillian's Lesson"	Temple Mathews	November 19, 1987
The girls give Jillian advice for getting the attention of her crush, which results in a series of embarrassing mishaps for her big brother Pierce.
45	"What the Hex Happening?"	Calvin Kelly	November 20, 1987
The Teen Club is plagued by misfortune after Bianca finds a diamond pendant and refuses to return it to its rightful owner, a gypsy fortune teller.
46	"Don't Judge a Book by Its Cover Girl"	Pat Allee; Ben Hurst	November 23, 1987
Bianca schedules an impromptu Teen Magazine modeling assignment for Larke so that she and Troy can spend the evening studying together.
47	"Private Club – Ghosts Only"	Susan J. Leslie	November 24, 1987
The teens decide to investigate a series of unexplained phenomena after a ghostly apparition begins haunting the corridors of the Teen Club.
48	"Poll Climbers"	Howard R. Cohen	November 25, 1987
Larke and Troy campaign to get Shanelle re-elected student body president while Bianca stages an extravagant campaign to elect Pierce.
49	"Rampage"	Paul Aratow	November 26, 1987
The Teen Club attempts a rescue after rock 'n' roll gorilla, "Prince Monko" escapes his cage and abducts Bianca during a circus charity benefit.
50	"That Winning Smile"	Jack Hanrahan; Eleanor Burian-Mohr	November 27, 1987
Bianca endures a treacherous day of filming her own stunts after sabotaging Larke's appearance in a "Winning Smile" toothpaste commercial.
51	"Eye of the Tigress"	Jack Olesker	November 30, 1987
The girls attempt to help Chester pass his physical education exam so that he will be eligible to help them compete in the "Teen IQ Quiz Show".
52	"Take Me Out to the Ball Game"	Pat Allee; Ben Hurst	December 1, 1987
It is a battle of the sexes when the girls challenge the boys to a softball game on the condition that they be allowed to join the team if they win.
53	"The Slumber Party"	Susan J. Leslie	December 2, 1987
A power outage causes the teens to become uneasy after Larke decides to host a slumber party for the girls while her parents are in Paris.
54	"Roughing It"	Doug Molitor	December 3, 1987
Larke and Troy find themselves unexpectedly joined by the entire Teen Club during a camping trip in Silver Valley to study for their biology final.
55	"The Buck Stops Here"	Lydia Marano	December 4, 1987
Bianca attempts to impress society photographer Ace Face after Buck Huckster sells her a new cosmetic which has unintended side effects.
56	"The Kindest Cut of All"	Jack Hanrahan; Eleanor Burian-Mohr	December 7, 1987
The girls devise a plan to teach Bianca a lesson about generosity while the boys each befriend Wilshire hoping to get his vanity license plates.
57	"Bianca's Diary"	Ken Kahn	December 8, 1987
Bianca and the teens devise a plan to teach Pierce a lesson after Pierce uses Bianca's diary as blackmail to persuade her to agree to a date.
58	"Go with the Flu"	Doug Molitor	December 9, 1987
A flu epidemic sidelines the boys before a competition with Valley High to determine which school's students will be the first teenagers in space.
59	"Nikki's Big Break"	Lydia Marano	December 10, 1987
The teens mistake a talent scout for Nikki's practical joking cousin and attempt to prevent him from attending the opening night of her play.
60	"McTech, P.I."	Phil Harnage	December 11, 1987
Chester becomes a private investigator when Bianca implicates Larke in the mysterious disappearance of the "Star of Rodeo Drive" diamond.
61	"The Tortoise and the Dare"	Ken Kahn	December 14, 1987
The world's wealthiest teens descend on Beverly Hills to compete in the Silver Spoon Olympics, beginning with the Millionaire's Marathon.
62	"Greens with Envy"	Ken Kahn	December 15, 1987
The world's wealthiest teens continue to compete in the Silver Spoon Olympics, which proceeds with the team golf and team polo events.
63	"Troy Triathlon"	Ken Kahn	December 16, 1987
The Silver Spoon Olympics concludes with its main event, a triathlon which comprises ice skating, downhill skiing, and, dive and dash events.
64	"Miracle at the Teen Club - Part 1"	Doug Molitor	December 17, 1987
The teens envision themselves as the players in an A Christmas Carol allegory while snowbound during Buck Huckster's Christmas Eve Party.
65	"Miracle at the Teen Club - Part 2"	Doug Molitor	December 18, 1987
The teens envision themselves as the players in an A Christmas Carol allegory while snowbound during Buck Huckster's Christmas Eve Party.

== Development ==
In January 1987, the wire services reported that Access Syndication, which was partnered with DIC Enterprises and Coca-Cola Telecommunications, had three new animated children's series in development for the fall of that year. The three series said to be in various stages of production at that time were Tiffany Blake, Starcom: The U.S. Space Force and Beverly Hills Teens. While Starcom and Teens were produced, Blake never got past the development stages.

Described by one columnist as "[s]poiled rich kids who attend classes equipped with Louis XIV antique desks", Beverly Hills Teens was touted by producers as a response to the more violent series aimed at children, maintaining that the new series would be less action-based and more character driven, and would provide "wholesome role models for kids".

President of Access Syndicate, Ritch Colbert, lamented the state of children's entertainment at the time, stating that the various children's shows were "dominated by neo-militaristic, boy-toy animation". Citing shows like SilverHawks, ThunderCats and G.I. Joe, which were popular animated series of the time, Colbert stated that there were no animated shows and characters like Tom and Jerry, and The Flintstones, in which children could identify with them.

When questioned as to whether "money-happy" teens residing in Beverly Hills would be the best examples for children, Colbert said that "they may be rather more wealthy than most teenagers, but they have typical teenagers' problems and the important thing is they are fully realized personalities".

While in development, early names for the series' four lead characters were reported as "Troy", "Chrissie", "Raven" and "Pierce". Although the boys' names would remain into the production of the series, the girls' names were subsequently changed, with "Chrissie" eventually becoming series protagonist "Larke", and "Raven" eventually being renamed "Bianca".

== Reception ==
In the 21st century, Beverly Hills Teens garnered a resurgence of attention from entertainment websites and newspaper columnists reminiscing about their childhoods in the 1980s. BuzzFeed writer, Brian Galindo, playfully touted the camp appeal of the cartoon as "embodying '80s decadence", describing the series as "the original Beverly Hills, 90210, but way, way more ridiculous".

Dilshan Boange, columnist for the Sri Lankan newspaper The Nation, cited the series (and, in particular, its theme song) for exporting American "epicurean" ideals, writing "the Beverly Hills Teens sing out the status quo of monopoly over 'style' and how it's 'done right'. It is a message to lesser mortals to take note. The center tells you what is 'in' and what's not. [...] Have you given much thought to how many US TV shows market their lifestyles to us on a daily basis through TV shows that speak of the 'American dream'?"

In Bulgaria, the show was first broadcast in 2002 on bTV as a part of the FoxKids block along with other '80s and '90s shows such as Masked Rider and Inspector Gadget. Thus, the age cohort that grew up watching the show were teens born from the late '80s to children born in the '90s. This introduced the '80s TV show to a much younger audience, including both Millennials and Generation Z members.

=== Accolades ===
Year	Award	Category	Recipient	Result	Ref.
1989	Youth in Film Award (now known as the Young Artist Award)	Best Animated Series	Beverly Hills Teens	Nominated	
1989	Youth in Film Award (now known as the Young Artist Award)	Best Young Actress in a Voice-over Role	Joanna Schellenberg	Nominated	

== Home media ==
During the series' lifespan, select episodes were released in the NTSC VHS format by Golden Book Video. In 1990, select episodes were released on single episode VHS tapes by Celebrity Home Entertainment as part of their Just for Kids Mini Features line.

In April 2007, Déclic Images released a Volume 1 DVD box set featuring the first 23 French dubbed episodes of the series - known as Bécé Bégé (BCBG...short for "Bon Chic, Bon Genre" or "Good Style, Good Class") in France - in the Region 2 format. Volumes 2 and 3, containing 20 and 22 episodes respectively, were released on November 28 of the same year. All three volumes were made available for purchase as a 3-box set of the entire series in May 2010.

Mill Creek Entertainment released a Volume 1 DVD set in February 2013, featuring the first 32 episodes of the series in the Region 1 format which includes a bonus episode of Heathcliff. Volume 2, featuring the remaining 33 episodes, was released in October of the same year.

== Broadcast UK history ==
- The Children's Channel (March 1, 1994 – February 28, 1998) (programmes: Beverly Hills Teens after Jem on 5 September 1994)

== Related media ==
A video game based on the series was in development by Tomahawk, but was cancelled.
