= Ryan Francis =

American basketball player (1987-2006)

Personal information
- Born: March 17, 1987 Baton Rouge, Louisiana, U.S.
- Died: May 13, 2006 (aged 19) Baton Rouge, Louisiana, U.S.
- Listed height: 5 ft 11 in (1.80 m)
- Listed weight: 180 lb (82 kg)

Career information
- High school: Glen Oaks (Baton Rouge, Louisiana)
- College: USC (2005–2006)
- Position: Point guard
- Number: 12

Ryan LeChanc Francis (March 17, 1987 – May 13, 2006) was an American college basketball player. At the time of his death, he was the starting point guard for the USC Trojans. He was murdered during a trip to his hometown in Baton Rouge, Louisiana, after his freshman season at USC.

== College career ==
As a freshman, Francis was the starting point guard during the 2005–2006 season for the USC Trojans and averaged 7.1 points, 3.7 assists and 1.6 steals per game. He ranked seventh in the Pac-10 Conference in assists and fifth in steals which was good enough to make the honorable-mention pac-10 all-freshman team selected by the conference coaches. His jersey number was 12. It has been suggested that after basketball he planned to enter coaching.

== High school career ==
Francis was a standout at Glen Oaks High School in Baton Rouge, Louisiana. He averaged 22 points and five assists per game in his senior year and led his team to a perfect 36–0 record and the Class 4A state title in 2005. Francis also won the MVP award for the state championship game and was named the 2005 Louisiana Class 4A Outstanding Player.

== Murder ==
Francis was shot and killed at about 3:30 a.m. May 13, 2006, while riding in a car in his hometown of Baton Rouge. As the vehicle pulled up to a stop light, the driver of another vehicle got out and opened fire. The shooter was identified as D'Anthony Norman Ford, also 19. According to the police report, Ford was driving an SUV and pulled in front of the car carrying Francis after recognizing the car's driver as someone he had been involved in a dispute with earlier that night, Francis was sitting in the back seat where he was shot multiple times; the two other occupants of the car identified Ford in a police line-up. On September 19, 2007, D'Anthony Ford was sentenced to life in prison without the possibility of probation or parole by District Court Judge Richard Moore.

== Being honored ==
Francis' funeral was held on May 20, 2006, at Greater King David Baptist Church, North Location in Baton Rouge, he was buried in nearby Southern Memorial Gardens. Coach Tim Floyd and the USC Basketball team flew in to attend. NCAA rules permitted USC to pay for both the entire funeral expenses and the team's travel to Louisiana. USC established The Ryan Francis Endowed Scholarship in honor of Francis.

For the 2006–2007 season, the Trojans Men's basketball team wore black #12 on their jerseys in honor of Francis. USC announced a tribute to Ryan Francis in a basketball game on March 17, 2007, the day that would have been Ryan's 20th birthday. The day was during the post-season tournament period in college basketball, and defying pre-season expectations, the USC basketball made it to the 2007 NCAA basketball tournament, and was placed in its first game on Friday, March 16. Honoring a promise to the memory of her son, Paulette Francis flew to Spokane, Washington, to watch the Trojans basketball team play their first game in the NCAA Tournament, speaking to the team before their 77–60 victory over Arkansas.

== See also ==
- List of basketball players who died during their careers
