= Black Cloud =

- Theatrical release poster
- Directed by: Rick Schroder
- Written by: Rick Schroder
- Produced by: Adam Batz; Karen Beninati
- Starring: Eddie Spears; Russel Means; Julia Jones; Rick Schroder; Tim McGraw; Marion "Pooch" Hall; Peter Greene; Wayne Knight; Nathaniel Arcand
- Cinematography: Steve Gainer
- Edited by: Geraud Brisson; Ed Marx
- Music by: Chad Fischer; John E. Nordstrom
- Production companies: High Maintenance Films; Old Post Films; Tule River Films
- Release date: October 1, 2004
- Running time: 97 minutes
- Country: United States
- Languages: English; Navajo

Black Cloud is a 2004 American drama film which was directed and written by Rick Schroder and starred Eddie Spears, Russel Means, Julia Jones, Schroder and Tim McGraw, in his film acting debut.

== Plot ==
Black Cloud, a young Navajo man, must take a journey of personal growth to prepare himself for a chance at boxing in the Olympics.

When Eddie returns to town with the rodeo and wants to rekindle his relationship with Black Cloud's girlfriend Sammi. Black Cloud confronts him and runs into trouble with Sheriff Cliff Powers after beating up Eddie who is Sammi's ex boyfriend and the father of her child, as well as Cliff's nephew.

After seeing Black Cloud in a boxing match an Olympic Scout named Norm Olsen offers him a try out for the team of the U.S. Olympics. Black Cloud rejects the offer initially believing that it would be unjust to "fight for the White Man". In trying to apply for Indian housing he and Sammi find out that his great grandfather was from Germany; believing he is cursed by his diluted bloodline, Black Cloud has a falling out with Sammi.

He goes to see his grandfather who takes him into the canyons and tells him about his family and the German man who helped his great grandmother after she was raped by several white men, and went by the name White Wolf. Realizing that his bloodline is pure, he decides to come back to Sammi and proposes to her.

He gets back into training for the tournament of the Golden Gloves which is coming up, and decides to take up the scout's offer if he wins. The day before the tournament, his best friend is seriously injured in a fight with Eddie and a set of other cowboys which Cliff refuses to arrest.

On the day of the tournament, Black Cloud goes through it to the finals where he meets Rocket Ray Tracy, the number one ranked light heavyweight fighter who is hoping to go pro after the tournament.

== Cast ==
- Eddie Spears as Black Cloud
- Russel Means as Bud
- Julia Jones as Sammi
- Rick Schroder as Eddie
- Tim McGraw as Sheriff Cliff Powers
- Marion "Pooch" Hall as Ray "Rocket Ray" Tracey
- Peter Greene as Norm Olsen
- Wayne Knight as Mr. Tipping
- Nathaniel Arcand as Jimmy
- Branscombe Richmond as Peter
- Alimi Ballard as Dusty

== Release ==
The film was not picked up for wide release but premiered at the Phoenix Film Festival in April 2004, and was seen at several small festivals including the April 2005 Haskell Indian Nations Film Festival in Kansas; it marked Schroder's directing debut.

== Reception ==
The film has an approval rating of 29% on Rotten Tomatoes from seven critic reviews.

=== Critical response ===
Scott Foundas of Variety wrote: "For his directorial debut, Rick Schroder ventures far afield from the mean streets of NYPD Blue. But despite its obvious good intentions, Native American boxing drama Black Cloud is a predictable formula pic that would scarcely make the undercard of a 1940s double-feature. Theatrical forecast for limited-release pic looks murky."

Kevin Thomas of the Los Angeles Times wrote: "Black Cloud is a modest, straightforward but affecting coming-of-age story about a young Navajo with a real talent for boxing but who is also his own worst enemy. It marks a solid writing and directing debut for actor Rick Schroder, and it is above all a fine showcase for Eddie Spears, a handsome, well-muscled Lakota Sioux with a smoldering screen presence. Navajo Nation locales, including sequences set in Monument Valley and Canyon de Chelly, provide the film’s photogenic settings."

Janice Page of The Boston Globe wrote: "Give Schroder props for shining a light on some of the same difficult Native American issues as Chris Eyre (Skins). But this film, with its many clichés and borrowed substitutes for creativity, suggests his career in the boxing arena might have peaked with The Champ."

=== Accolades ===
The film won the "Best Director Award" at the San Diego Film Festival in October 2004.
