= Too Young the Hero =

1988 television film directed by Buzz Kulik

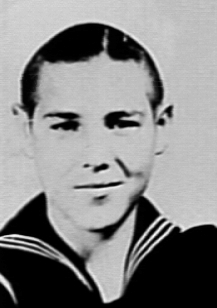
- Calvin Graham, subject of the film, at age 12
- Genre: Biography; Drama; War
- Written by: Calvin Graham; Gary Thomas
- Teleplay by: David J. Kinghorn
- Directed by: Buzz Kulik
- Starring: Rick Schroder
- Music by: Steve Dorff
- Country of origin: United States
- Original language: English

Production
- Executive producers: Joan Barnett; Pierre Cossette; Alan Landsburg; Howard Lipstone
- Producer: Buzz Kulik
- Production locations: Virginia Beach, Virginia; Wilmington, North Carolina; Battleship USS North Carolina Museum, North Carolina
- Cinematography: Don Burgess
- Editor: Les Green
- Running time: 97 minutes
- Production companies: Rick-Dawn Enterprises; Pierre Cossette Enterprises; Landsburg Company

Original release
- Network: CBS
- Release: March 27, 1988

Too Young the Hero is a 1988 American made-for-television historical drama war film directed by Buzz Kulik and starring Rick Schroder. It premiered on CBS on March 27, 1988. The film tells the true story of a 12-year-old boy who forges his mother's signature to join the United States Navy during World War II. It is based on the real life of Calvin Graham, who was the youngest American serviceman of the war. The film was produced by Trucon Productions in Virginia Beach, Virginia and in Wilmington, North Carolina for CBS.

== Plot ==
Calvin Graham (Ricky Schroder), a 12-year-old boy who looks older than his age, shows up at a naval base in uniform with a set of sealed orders. After his orders are reviewed, he is arrested (without explanation) and taken to the brig. In prison, he has a series of flashbacks during which he forges his mother's signature to enlist in the U.S. Navy, completes basic training and is assigned to the USS South Dakota (BB-57).

Graham unsuccessfully tries to get himself released from prison by saying he is underage, but nobody believes him. He then learns that he's in prison for desertion and, as a result, is unable to get any messages out.

When Graham is asked about a wound in the back of his head, he remembers the USS South Dakota fighting in the Naval Battle of Guadalcanal. One of Graham's shipmates is killed, and several others, including Graham, are wounded. Lauding Graham's bravery, the ship's captain recommends him for two Purple Hearts. Graham's ship enters port in New York City for repairs, but when Graham learns that his grandmother has died, he asks to go to Texas to attend her funeral. The ship's executive officer, who has assumed command, gives Graham a four-day pass, knowing he cannot make it back in time. He tells Graham to go to the recruiting office in Texas and turn himself in when the pass expires. Graham reports as directed, expecting his story about being underage to be verified so he can be released. However, as depicted in the opening scenes, he is arrested instead.

Graham spends his 13th birthday being nearly worked to death by abusive guards who refuse to believe him. Meanwhile, his sister receives an anonymous phone call telling her that Graham is in the brig. After pleading with the Provost Marshal gets her nowhere, she goes to the newspaper, which finally gets her brother released. As Graham is reunited with his sister, the viewers learn that in 1978, Graham's medals were restored and he was given an honorable discharge, while his veteran's benefits were still pending (as of the date of the film).

== Cast ==
- Ricky Schroder as Calvin Graham
- R. Pickett Bugg as Pico
- Jon DeVries as Captain Thomas Gatch
- Rick Warner as Holbrook
- Mary-Louise Parker as Pearl Spencer
- Debra Mooney as Calvin's mother
- Ron Shelley as Cracker
- Christopher Dioni as Avila
- Carl Mueller as Sargent Shriver
- Tom Wood as Cluff
- Christopher Curry as Laslo
