= Ricky Schroder =

American actor (born 1970)

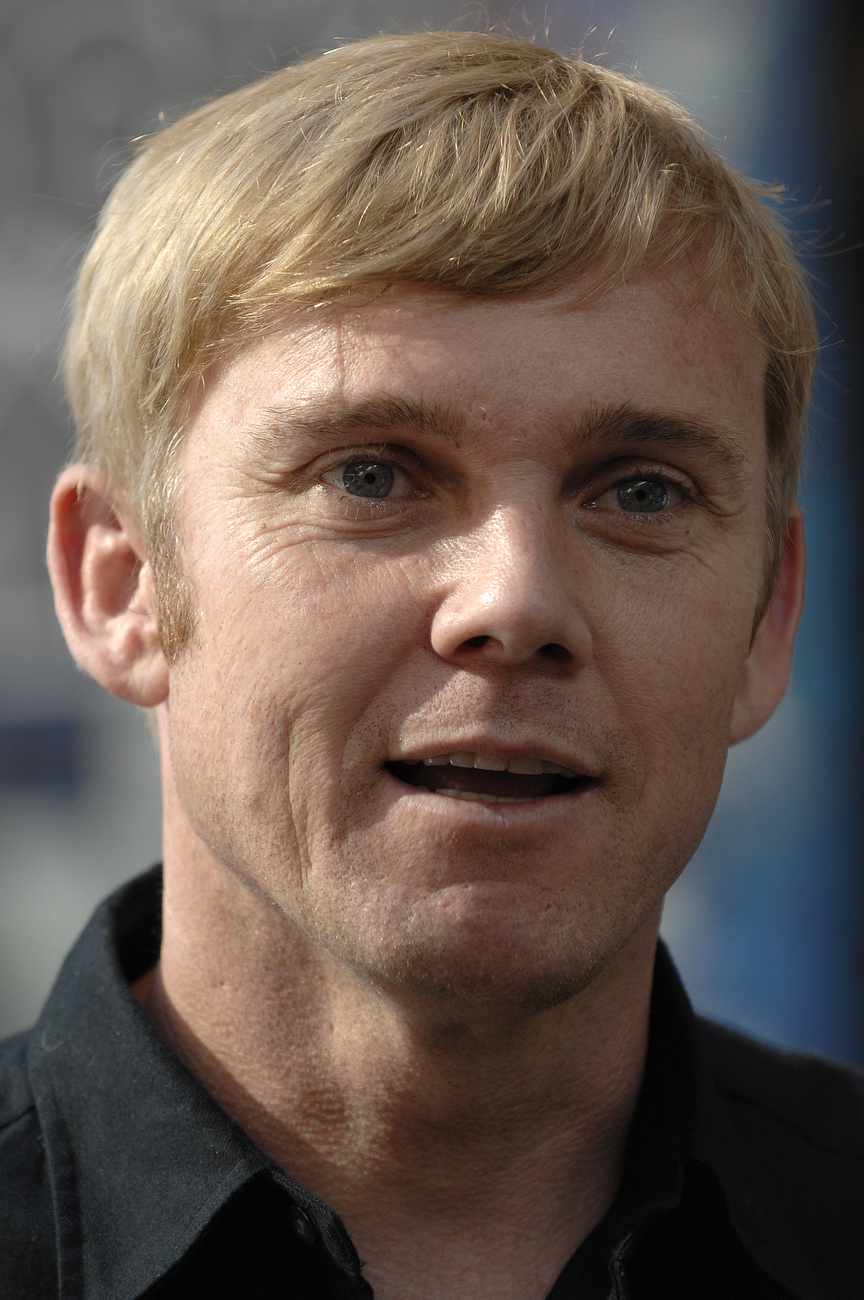
- Schroder in 2008
- Born: Richard Bartlett Schroder; April 13, 1970 (age 56); Brooklyn, New York City, U.S.
- Other name: Rick Schroder
- Occupations: Actor; film director; film producer
- Years active: 1976–2016
- Spouses: Andrea Bernard (m. 1992; div. 2016) Julie Trammel (m. 2025)
- Children: 4

Richard Bartlett Schroder (born April 13, 1970) is an American actor and filmmaker. As a child actor billed as Ricky Schroder he debuted in the film The Champ (1979), for which he became the youngest Golden Globe award recipient, and went on to become a child star on the sitcom Silver Spoons (1982–87). He has continued acting as an adult, usually billed as Rick Schroder, notably in the Western miniseries Lonesome Dove (1989) and on the police drama series NYPD Blue (1998–2001). He made his directorial debut with the film Black Cloud (2004) and has produced several films and television series, including the anthology film Locker 13 and the war documentary The Fighting Season.

He was ranked at #18 and #33 on VH1's list of the "100 Greatest Kid-Stars" and “100 Greatest Teen Stars” list, respectively.

== Early life ==
Schroder was born in Brooklyn, New York City and raised on Great Kills, Staten Island, the son of Diane Katherine Bartlett and Richard John Schroder, both former employees of AT&T. His paternal grandparents were German immigrants. Schroder's mother quit her job to raise him and his sister Dawn. As a child, Schroder appeared in many catalogs, and by age six, he had appeared in 60 advertisements.

== Career ==
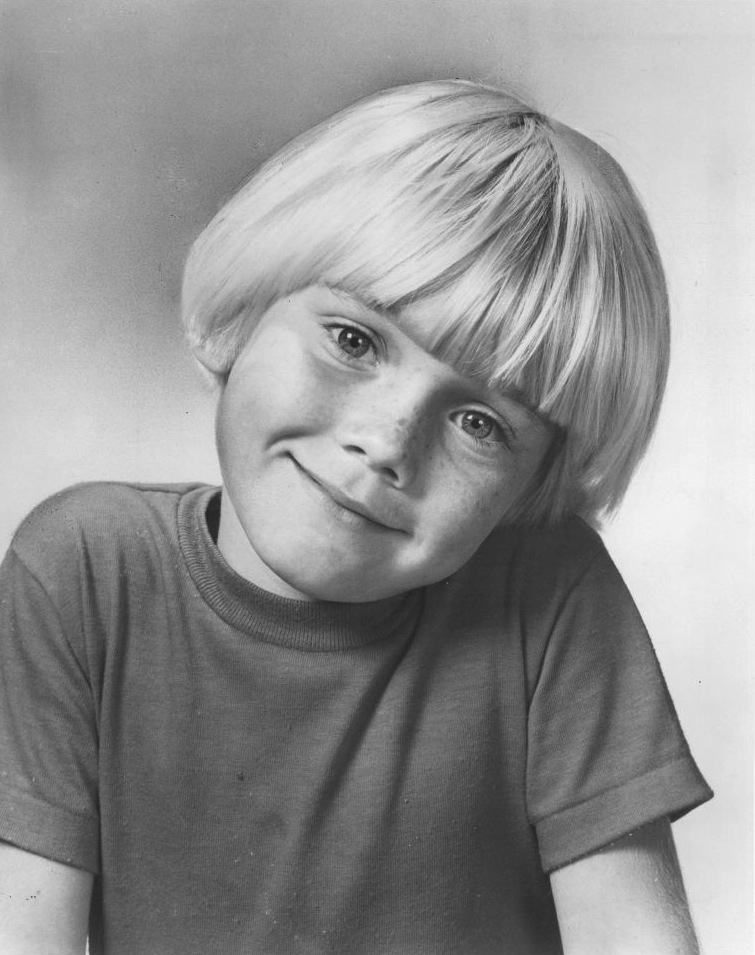
Schroder as a child actor in 1976

=== As a child actor ===
Schroder made his film debut as the son of Jon Voight's character in The Champ, a 1979 remake of the 1931 film of the same title. He was nominated for, and subsequently won, a Golden Globe award in 1980 for Best New Male Star of the Year in a Motion Picture, becoming at age nine the youngest Golden Globe winner in history. Following his role in The Champ, Schroder was removed from school by his parents in the third grade to focus on his career. He moved to Los Angeles with his mother, but his father remained in New York City and kept his job with AT&T. The following year, Schroder appeared in the Disney feature film The Last Flight of Noah's Ark, with Elliott Gould. He also starred as the title character in Little Lord Fauntleroy, alongside Alec Guinness.

Schroder then became well known as the star of the television series Silver Spoons. He played a starring role as Ricky Stratton, the son of a wealthy and eccentric millionaire, Edward Stratton. His performance earned him two Young Artist Awards. He struggled with his identity as an actor when Silver Spoons ended. Prospective roles were rare, and he was mainly designated to play boyish-looking teenagers or blond-haired heartthrobs. Schroder avoided the vices of other child actors and attempted to establish himself as a more mature actor, dropping the "y" from his first name. His mother enrolled him in Calabasas High School, but Schroder had trouble adjusting to the new environment.

In 1988, a year after Silver Spoons ended, Schroder starred in a prime time CBS TV movie based on a true story, the drama Too Young the Hero, as 12-year-old Calvin Graham who passes for 17 to enlist in World War II. He also appeared as the guest timekeeper in WrestleMania 2 for a match between Hulk Hogan and King Kong Bundy. In 1990, he was in Across the Tracks as the younger brother of Brad Pitt.

=== Later career ===
After graduating from high school, Schroder enrolled in Mesa State College in Grand Junction, Colorado. His co-starring role in the Western miniseries Lonesome Dove and its sequel, Return to Lonesome Dove, helped him to be recognized in more mature roles. His roles as Danny Sorenson on three seasons of NYPD Blue, nurse Paul Flowers in Scrubs, Dr. Dylan West on Strong Medicine, and Mike Doyle on the 2007 season of 24 worked to cement that perception with the viewing audience. In the fall of 2002 he hosted The New American Sportsman on ESPN2, a remake of the 1965–1986 outdoor TV series The American Sportsman.

Schroder made his directorial debut in 2004 with the feature film Black Cloud, a drama also written by him about a Navajo boxer. Black Cloud received positive receptions at film festivals, including two awards at the Phoenix Film Festival and Best Director award for Schroder at the San Diego Film Festival. He also directed and starred in the music video for "Whiskey Lullaby", a song by Brad Paisley and Alison Krauss. The video garnered Schroder an award for Best Music Video at the 2005 Nashville Film Festival, while at the 2005 CMT Music Awards, the video won an award for Collaborative Video of the Year, and Schroder won for Director of the Year.

In 2009, he directed the adventure horror film Hellhounds. He guest-starred in a January 2011 episode of ABC's No Ordinary Family.

With his production company, Ricky Schroder Productions, he produced Starting Strong, a series of recruiting commercials for the U.S. Army shot as reality series in 2013. His production company has well as other documentaries The Fighting Season, My Fighting Season, and The Volunteers. Schroder spent 110 days in Afghanistan with the US military in 2014 to capture footage. In 2013 he directed, produced, and starred in the TV film Our Wild Hearts for the Hallmark Channel, and the following year co-produced and starred in the anthology film Locker 13. He portrayed the father of the country music singer Dolly Parton in the 2015 TV film Dolly Parton's Coat of Many Colors and its sequel, Dolly Parton's Christmas of Many Colors: Circle of Love.

== Personal life ==
Schroder married Andrea Bernard on September 26, 1992. They have four children: Holden, Luke, Cambrie, and Faith. They all appeared in Schroder's Our Wild Hearts (2013). In 2000, Schroder joined his wife's church, The Church of Jesus Christ of Latter-day Saints. He is not very vocal about his religious beliefs, and said in a 2015 interview: "I don't consider myself an extremely religious person, but at the same time I do believe there is higher power." He and his wife separated in 2016, and she filed for divorce later in the year.

He is an avid hunter and fisherman, having learned to shoot at the age of 10 from actor William Holden on the set of The Earthling. For 16 years he owned a 15,000-acre (6,100 ha) ranch near Grand Junction, Colorado, adjacent to Grand Mesa National Forest.

A 2004 news article called Schroder "one of the few out-of-the-closet conservatives" in the entertainment industry. Schroder has long identified as a Republican, and he spoke at the 2000 Republican National Convention, although he said in 2010 that he did not align with either major political party.

In 2019, Schroder was arrested twice within a month for suspicion of domestic violence; no charges were filed.

In 2020, Schroder contributed $150,000 towards the $2 million bail fund for Kyle Rittenhouse, a 17-year-old charged and later acquitted in the shooting deaths of two people during the August 2020 unrest in Kenosha, Wisconsin.

In 2021, Schroder created controversy when he uploaded a video to social media that showed him harassing a Costco employee regarding the company's policy and California mandate requiring face masks or coverings to be worn inside stores during the COVID-19 pandemic. Shortly after the incident, Schroder began receiving backlash, causing him to upload a second video apologizing to the employee, stating that while he stood by his beliefs on the mask mandate, he was sorry if he hurt the employee's feelings. Later in the pandemic, in 2022, Schroder entered the Dwight D. Eisenhower Presidential Library without a mask, and upon being notified that masks are required for entry, called the security guard a "Nazi" for enforcing "evil federal government" mask rules. He left the building without incident.

Schroder married Julie Trammel on July 9, 2025, in Cabo San Lucas, Mexico.

In 2026, Schroder sparked widespread online backlash following the death of Dolly Parton, when he posted a controversial social media tribute criticizing her support for transgender rights and COVID-19 vaccines.

== Filmography ==
=== Film ===
Year	Title	Role	Notes
1979	The Champ	Timothy Joseph ("T.J.") Flynn	
1980	The Last Flight of Noah's Ark	Bobby	
1980	The Earthling	Shawn Daley	
1980	Little Lord Fauntleroy	Ceddie Errol (Little Lord Fauntleroy)	
1984	Broadway Danny Rose	Thanksgiving Parade Celebrity	Uncredited
1991	Across the Tracks	Billy Maloney	
1994	There Goes My Baby	Stick	
1995	Crimson Tide	Lt. Paul Hellerman	
2002	Poolhall Junkies	Brad	
2003	Face of Terror	Nick Harper	
2003	Consequence	John Wolfe	
2004	Black Cloud	Eddie	
2009	Locker 13	Tommy Novak	
2010	Blood Done Sign My Name	Vernon Tyson	
2010	Get Him to the Greek	Himself	

=== Television ===
Year	Title	Role	Notes
1982	Something So Right	Joey Bosnick	Movie
1982–1987	Silver Spoons	Ricky Stratton	116 episodes
1983	Faerie Tale Theatre	Hansel	Episode: "Hansel and Gretel"
1983	Two Kinds of Love	Robbie Farley	Movie
1985	A Reason to Live	Alex Stewart	Movie
1988	Too Young the Hero	Calvin Graham	Movie
1989	Terror on Highway 91	Clay Nelson	Movie
1989	Out on the Edge	Danny Evetts	Movie
1989	Lonesome Dove	Newt Dobbs	Miniseries; 4 episodes
1990	A Son's Promise	Terry O'Kelly	Movie
1990	The Stranger Within	Mark	Movie
1991	Blood River	Jimmy Pearls ("The Kid")	Movie
1991	My Son Johnny	Johnny Cortino	Movie
1992	Miles from Nowhere	Frank Reilly	Movie
1993	Call of the Wild	John Thornton	Movie
1993	Return to Lonesome Dove	Newt Dobbs	Miniseries; 4 episodes
1994	Texas	Otto MacNab	Movie
1994	To My Daughter with Love	Joey Cutter	Movie
1994	In the Heat of the Night	A bad guy	Episode: "Dangerous Engagement"
1996	Innocent Victims	Billy Richardson	Movie
1997	Ebenezer	Samuel Benson	Movie
1997	Too Close to Home	Nick Donahue	Movie
1997	Detention: The Siege at Johnson High	Jason Copeland	Movie
1997	Heart Full of Rain	Isaiah Dockett	Movie
1998–2001	NYPD Blue	Det. Danny Sorenson	58 episodes
1999	Murder at Devil's Glen	Henry	Movie (aka What We Did That Night)
2001	The Lost Battalion	Major Charles White Whittlesey	Movie
2003	Scrubs	Nurse Paul Flowers	4 episodes
2005	14 Hours	Dr. Foster	Movie
2005–2006	Strong Medicine	Dr. Dylan West	19 episodes
2006	Robot Chicken	Cloudkeeper	Episode: "Password: Swordfish"
2007	24	Mike Doyle	12 episodes
2008	Journey to the Center of the Earth	Jonathan Brock	Movie
2008	The Andromeda Strain	Major Bill Keane MD	Miniseries; 4 episodes
2010	No Ordinary Family	Dave Cotten	Episode: "No Ordinary Friends"
2011	To the Mat	Aaron	Movie
2013	Goodnight for Justice: Queen of Hearts	Cyril Knox	Movie
2013	Our Wild Hearts	Jack Thomas	Movie
2014	Hell's Kitchen	Himself	Season 13 Episode 15: "4 Chefs Compete"
2015	Dolly Parton's Coat of Many Colors	Robert Lee Parton	Movie
2016	Dolly Parton's Christmas of Many Colors: Circle of Love	Robert Lee Parton	Movie

=== Director ===
- 2004: Black Cloud
- 2009: Hellhounds
- 2013: Our Wild Hearts

== Awards and nominations ==
Year	Association	Category	Title of work	Result
1979	Golden Globe Awards	New Star of the Year – Actor	The Champ	Won
1979	Young Artist Awards	Best Juvenile Actor in a Motion Picture	The Champ	Nominated
1980	Young Artist Awards	Best Young Actor in a Major Motion Picture	The Last Flight of Noah's Ark	Nominated
1981	Young Artist Awards	Best Young Motion Picture Actor	The Earthling	Won
1982	Young Artist Awards	Best Young Actor in a Movie Made for Television	Little Lord Fauntleroy	Nominated
1982	Young Artist Awards	Best Young Actor in a New Television Series	Silver Spoons	Won
1983	Young Artist Awards	Best Young Actor in a New Television Series	Silver Spoons	Won
1990	Golden Globe Awards	Best Actor – Miniseries or Television Film	The Stranger Within	Nominated
1999	Screen Actors Guild	Outstanding Performance by a Male Actor in a Drama Series	NYPD Blue	Nominated
1999	Screen Actors Guild	Outstanding Performance by an Ensemble in a Drama Series	NYPD Blue	Nominated
2004	San Diego Film Festival	Best Film	Black Cloud (dir. Rick Schroeder)	Won

== Bibliography ==
- Holmstrom, John (1996). The Moving Picture Boy: An International Encyclopaedia from 1895 to 1995. Norwich: Michael Russell. pp. 379–380.
