= Andrea Elson =

American former actress (born 1969)

- Born: Andrea Hope Elson; March 6, 1969 (age 57); New York City, New York, U.S.
- Occupations: Actress; model
- Years active: 1983–1998
- Known for: ALF; Whiz Kids
- Spouse: Scott Hopper (m. 1993)
- Children: 2

Andrea Hope Elson (born March 6, 1969) is an American former child model and child actress, best known for her science fiction television roles as Alice Tyler on the CBS adventure series Whiz Kids, and as Lynn Tanner on the NBC comedy series ALF, which garnered her two Youth in Film Award nominations in 1986 and 1989.

== Early life ==
Elson was born in New York City on March 6, 1969. She grew up in New York City with her parents and an older sister named Samantha (born circa 1966). While she was a child, the family moved to San Diego, California for four years before returning to Westchester County, New York.

== Career ==
Elson began her professional career as a child model and actress, appearing in a number of commercials, print advertisements and community theatre productions in San Diego.

In 1983, after relocating with her family to Los Angeles, Elson made her television debut at the age of 14 with a co-starring role on the CBS mystery-adventure series, Whiz Kids. She portrayed Alice Tyler, co-starring with Matthew Laborteaux, Todd Porter, and Jeffrey Jacquet as a group of teenage detectives who solve crimes and bring the perpetrators of them to justice with the help of a talking computer.

Although Whiz Kids aired for only one season, Elson's role as Alice established the 14-year-old and her teenage co-stars as prominent fixtures in the various teen magazines of the era, including 16 magazine, Bop and Teen Beat, among others. The role also led to all the teenage Whiz Kids crossing over into a 1983 episode of Simon & Simon titled "Fly the Alibi Skies".

In 1986, Elson landed a co-starring role on the NBC science-fiction situation comedy ALF. She portrayed Lynn Tanner, the teenage daughter in a typical middle-class suburban family who adopt a friendly extraterrestrial being, performed by puppeteer Paul Fusco. The series lasted four seasons and her portrayal earned her two Youth in Film Award nominations before the series' cancellation in 1990.

After the cancellation of ALF, Elson continued to appear in a variety of television roles, guest starring on a number of television series, including Who's the Boss?, Parker Lewis Can't Lose, ABC Afterschool Special, Married... with Children, Mad About You, Step by Step, and The Young and the Restless, as well as appearing in the television films Class Cruise and Frankenstein: The College Years.

== Personal life ==
Elson married former ALF stage manager Scott Hopper in 1993. They have a daughter, Claire, and a son, Dean. As of 2016, she owns and operates a yoga studio.

== Filmography ==
=== Television ===
Year	Title	Role	Notes
1983	Simon & Simon	Alice Tyler	Episode: "Fly the Alibi Skies"
1983–1984	Whiz Kids	Alice Tyler	18 episodes
1985	Silver Spoons	Kimberley	Episode: "Promises, Promises"
1986–1990	ALF	Lynn Tanner	100 episodes
1987	Wordplay	Self - Celebrity Panelist	3 episodes
1989	The New Hollywood Squares	Self - Panelist	1 episode
1989	Class Cruise	Staci Poston	Television film
1990	Who's the Boss?	Melinda	Episode: "One Flew Over the Empty Nest"
1990	Parker Lewis Can't Lose	Denise	Episode: "Musso & Frank"
1990	They Came from Outer Space	Julie Carter	Episode: "Trading Faces"
1991	ABC Afterschool Special	Liz	Episode: "The Less Than Perfect Daughter"
1991	Married People	Madeline	Episode: "Dance Ten, Friends Zero"
1991	Frankenstein: The College Years	Andi Richmond	Television film
1993	Married... with Children	Heidi	Episode: "Wedding Show"
1994	Mad About You	Joanne	Episode: "Cold Feet"
1996	Step by Step	Bonnie	Episode: "Forever Young"
1996	Kirk		Episode: "Baby, You Can Drive My Car"
1997	Men Behaving Badly	Girl #1	Episode: "It's Good to Be Dead"
1998	The Young and the Restless	Debbie Thompson	
2001	E! True Hollywood Story	Herself	Episode: "The Young and the Restless"
2002	I Love the '80s	Herself	TV Miniseries
2020	Forgotten TV	Herself	Episode: "The Whiz Kid Stars Speak" Podcast series

== Video games ==
Year	Title	Role
1994	Surgical Strike	Co-Pilot

== Soundtrack ==
Year	Production	Notes
1986-1987	ALF	TV Series; Episode: "A.L.F." performer: "Proud Mary"
1986-1987	ALF	TV Series; Episode: "On the Road Again" performer: "99 Bottles of Beer" (uncredited)
1986-1987	ALF	Episode: "Try to Remember: Part 2" performer: "Proud Mary" (uncredited)

== Awards ==
Year	Award	Category	Work	Result
1986	Youth in Film Award (now known as the Young Artist Award)	Exceptional Young Actress in a New Television Comedy Series	ALF	Nominated
1989	Youth in Film Award (now known as the Young Artist Award)	Best Young Actress Starring in a Television Comedy Series	ALF	Nominated
1989	Bravo Otto Award	Best Female TV Star	ALF	3rd place
