= Benji Gregory =

American actor (1978–2024)

- Born: Benjamin Gregory Hertzberg; May 26, 1978; Los Angeles, California, U.S.
- Died: June 13, 2024 (aged 46); Peoria, Arizona, U.S.
- Education: Academy of Art University
- Occupation: Actor
- Years active: 1984–1993
- Television: Brian Tanner on ALF
- Spouse: Sarah (m. 2006, divorced)

Benjamin Gregory Hertzberg (known professionally as Benji Gregory; May 26, 1978 – June 13, 2024) was an American actor best known for playing Brian Tanner on the 1986–1990 NBC sitcom ALF.

== Early life ==
Benjamin Gregory Hertzberg was born in Los Angeles, California, on May 26, 1978. Multiple members of his family worked in the entertainment industry, and his grandmother worked as his agent. He was raised in Thousand Oaks, California, and began appearing in commercials when he was an infant.

== Acting career ==
Gregory, beside his main role on ALF, appeared in several television shows which included Fantastic Max (1988–1990), Pound Puppies (1986–1987), Murphy Brown (1988), The A-Team (1984), T.J. Hooker (1984), Amazing Stories (1985), The Twilight Zone (1985), and Mr. Boogedy (1986). He also made an appearance in the feature film Jumpin' Jack Flash (1986).

Gregory appeared as himself in the PSAs television series The More You Know, the children's game show series I'm Telling!, the "Salute to the 50 States episodes" of the game show Fun House, as well as on a kids episode of The Dating Game.

Gregory made several appearances on the television sitcom Punky Brewster, playing an orphan named "Dash," and supplied the voice of Edgar the Mole in the animated feature Once Upon a Forest (1993), which would be his final acting role. He was scheduled to co-star in a Punky Brewster spin-off called Fenster Hall. The pilot/television-movie of Fenster Hall was never picked up for regular production.

Benji Gregory and Alf

== Naval career ==
After graduating from school, Gregory enlisted in the U.S. Navy in 2003 and became an aerographer's mate. He was assigned to the USS Carl Vinson (CVN-70). In 2005, he received an honorable medical discharge.

== Personal life and death ==
Gregory married Sarah Anne Hall in 2006 after completing his naval service. They later divorced.

On June 13, 2024, Gregory and his service dog were found dead inside a car at a bank parking lot in Peoria, Arizona. He was 46 years old. Pending an investigation of the cause, and allowing the family time to mourn, the death was not publicly announced until July 10. His sister said that he had bipolar and sleep disorders and likely died of heat stroke after falling asleep in his car. On September 13, 2024, the Maricopa County Medical Examiner revealed that Gregory had died of both hepatic cirrhosis, with Gregory being revealed to have had a damaged liver, and heat exposure. The death was ruled accidental.

== Filmography ==
=== Film ===
| Year | Title | Role(s) |
|---|---|---|
| 1986 | Jumpin' Jack Flash | Harry Carlson, Jr. |
| 1993 | Once Upon a Forest | Edgar (voice) |

=== Television ===
| Year | Title | Role(s) | Note(s) |
|---|---|---|---|
| 1984 | The A-Team | Eric | Episode: "Hot Styles" |
| 1984 | T.J. Hooker | Sean | Episode: "The Confession" |
| 1985 | Punky Brewster | Dash | 2 episodes |
| 1985 | Amazing Stories | Sam | Episode: "Alamo Jobe" |
| 1985 | The Twilight Zone | Boy | Episode: "Night of the Meek" |
| 1986 | Thompson's Last Run | Little John | Television film |
| 1986–1990 | ALF | Brian Tanner | main cast |
| 1988 | Disney's All-Star Comedy Circus | Himself | Television special |
| 1991 | Murphy Brown | Brian | Episode: "On Another Plane" |
| 1991 | Never Forget | Kenny Mermelstein | Television film |
