= He's No Heavy, He's My Brother =

He's No Heavy, He's My Brother may refer to:

- "He's No Heavy... He's My Brother", an episode of The Mary Tyler Moore Show
- "He's No Heavy, He's My Brother", an episode of Check It Out!

He's Not Heavy, He's My Brother may refer to:

- "He's Not Heavy, He's My Brother-in-Law", an episode of The Bounder
- "He's Not Heavy, He's My Half-Brother", an episode of One on One
- "He's Not Heavy, He's Neal's Brother", an episode of I'm a Big Girl Now

== See also ==
- He Ain't Heavy (disambiguation)
- He's Not Heavy (disambiguation)
- He Ain't Heavy, He's My Brother (disambiguation)
