= He Ain't Heavy, He's My Father (disambiguation) =

He Ain't Heavy, He's My Father is a Hong Kong film, also known as 新難兄難弟 or He Ain't Heavy, He's My Brother.

He Ain't Heavy, He's My Father may also refer to:

- "He Ain't Heavy, He's My Father", an episode of Dharma & Greg
- "He Ain't Heavy, He's My Father", an episode of Roc

== See also ==
- He Ain't Heavy (disambiguation)
- He Ain't Heavy, He's My Brother (disambiguation)
- She Ain't Heavy (disambiguation)
- "He Ain't Heavy, Father...", an episode of The Cavanaughs
- "I Ain't Heavy, I'm Your Father", an episode of The Hughleys
