= Thurgood Marshall School of Law =

Law school of Texas Southern University in Houston, Texas

- Parent school: Texas Southern University
- Established: 1946; 80 years ago
- School type: Public HBCU law school
- Dean: Okezie Chukwumerije
- Location: Houston, Texas, U.S.
- Enrollment: 551
- Faculty: 93 (45 full-time)
- USNWR ranking: 178-195th (2025)
- Bar pass rate: 63.45% (2023 all jurisdictions); 75.91% (Texas 2024)
- Website: www.tsulaw.edu

The Thurgood Marshall School of Law (TMSL) is the ABA-accredited law school of Texas Southern University, a historically Black public university in Houston, Texas. It awards Juris Doctor and Master of Law degrees. Thurgood Marshall School of Law is a member-school of the Thurgood Marshall College Fund and Association of American Law Schools.

== History ==
The history of TMSL can be traced back to a 1946 lawsuit implicating protections for racial minorities under the U.S. Constitution, Sweatt v. Painter, brought by Heman M. Sweatt, and tried by Thurgood Marshall. The Texas Constitution mandated separate but equal facilities for whites and blacks. Sweatt was refused admission to the University of Texas School of Law because he was black. In order to pre-empt the possibility of Sweatt obtaining a successful court order, the legislature passed Texas State Senate Bill 140, which established a university to offer courses of higher learning in law, pharmacy, dentistry, journalism, education, arts and sciences, literature, medicine, and other professional courses. It opened in 1946 as the "Texas State University for Negroes," and later changed its name in Texas Southern University in 1951.

In 2016, TMSL began to offer a Master of Laws in Immigration and Naturalization Law. The program is the first Masters of Law program in the nation to focus on immigration law.

In 2017, The American Bar Association (ABA) formally censured the school as "being out of compliance with its nondiscrimination standard as well as the standard that requires disclosure of information to the ABA. More specifically, an ABA site visit team found evidence of gender discrimination and sexual harassment at the law school" and was "required to establish a plan to eliminate gender discrimination and sex harassment." Months prior, the ABA had also "found Texas Southern University School of Law (TMSL) out of compliance with the standards meant to ensure schools only admit students who appear capable of graduating and passing the bar." In 2020, the ABA concluded TMSL was in compliance with all accreditation standards.

== Admissions and student demographics ==
Of the 1,914 students who applied to TMSL to start in fall 2024, 682 were accepted (a 35.63% admission rate), and 209 of those offered admission enrolled (a 28.45% yield rate). The enrolled students had an average LSAT score of 150, and an average college GPA of 3.21. The reported 25th/75th percentile LSAT scores and GPAs were 148/152 and 2.73/3.61.

As of October, 2024, out of a student body of 551 members, 298 were African-American, 26 Asian-American, 50 White, 167 Hispanic, 4 American Indian or Alaska Native, and 6 Unknown, for a Total People of Color of 495.

== Ranking ==
For 2025, the law school was ranked No.178-195 out of 196 schools (bottom 9.2% at most) by U.S. News & World Report.

== Bar passage rate ==
For July 2024 first time takers, TMSL students had a bar examination passage rate of 75.91% for the Texas Bar Examination, while they had a first-time passage rate of 63.45% for all jurisdictions in 2023.

== Employment ==
According to Thurgood Marshall's official 2022 ABA-required disclosures, 53% of the Class of 2022 obtained full-time, long-term, JD-required employment nine months after graduation.

== Costs ==
The total estimated cost of attendance (indicating the cost of tuition, fees) at Thurgood Marshall for the 2018-2019 academic year is $43,095 for residents and $50,318 for nonresidents.

== TMSL Library ==
The TMSL Library housed within the law school building has over 350,000 volumes and volume equivalents.

== TMSL Legal Clinics ==
- Earl Carl Institute for Legal and Social Justice, Inc.: An institute dedicated to identifying potential implementable solutions to legal and social issues disproportionately impacting minority communities
- Center for Legal Pedagogy: It serves as a study and creation center of instructional design for legal education
- Institute for International and Immigration Law: An institute dedicated to providing specialized academic and practical legal training for students planning a career in international or immigration law

== Publications ==
- Thurgood Marshall Law Review - The law review was established in 1970 and is a legal research and writing forum for legal scholars and practitioners.
- The Thurgood Marshall School of Law Gender, Race, and Justice Law Journal - A student-run organization whose primary purpose is to publish a journal of legal scholarship.

== Notable alumni ==
Notable graduates of TSML include the following:

- Roberto R. Alonzo (J.D., 1984), member of the Texas House of Representatives
- Stephanie Flowers (J.D., 1991), attorney and member of the Arkansas State Senate and former Arkansas state representative
- Sylvia Garcia (J.D., 1978), former member of the Texas Senate, 6th District (Houston), now U.S. representative for Texas's 29th congressional district
- Al Green, (J.D., 1974), U.S. Representative for 9th Congressional District of Texas
- Kenneth M. Hoyt (J.D., 1972), senior status United States District judge
- Hank Johnson, (J.D. 1979), U.S. Representative for 4th Congressional District of Georgia
- Harry E. Johnson (J.D., 1986), president and CEO of Martin Luther King, Jr. Memorial Project Memorial Foundation
- Leslie D. King (J.D., 1973), Mississippi Supreme Court associate justice
- Chokwe Antar Lumumba (J.D. 2008), mayor of Jackson, Mississippi
- Colion Noir (J.D., 2012), lawyer and gun rights activist.
- Morris Overstreet (J.D., 1975) (deceased), first African-American elected to statewide office in Texas
- Belvin Perry (J.D., 1977), former chief judge in Florida's Ninth Judicial Circuit, presiding judge for the high-profile Casey Anthony murder trial.
- Senfronia Thompson (J.D., 1978), member of the Texas House of Representatives
- Craig Washington (J.D., 1969), former U.S. Congressman, 18th District (Texas).
- Brian C. Wimes (J.D., 1994), judge, United States District Court for the Eastern District of Missouri and for the Western District of Missouri
