= Intellectual Properties Management =

Intellectual Properties Management is a for-profit corporation based in Atlanta, Georgia, United States. It is the exclusive licensor of the estate of Dr. Martin Luther King Jr. and its chief executive officer was Dexter King.

Its administrative offices are located in Freedom Hall on the campus of King Center for Nonviolent Social Change in Atlanta. It has licensed the use of Dr. King's words and image for various projects, including the Martin Luther King Jr. Memorial, a 2001 Alcatel commercial, and a 2018 Super Bowl commercial for Ram pickup trucks.
