= He's Heavy, He's My Brother =

He's Heavy, He's My Brother may refer to:

- "He's Heavy, He's My Brother", an episode of American sitcom Tom
- "He's Heavy, He's My Brother", an episode of British sitcom Sunnyside Farm
- "He Is Heavy, He's My Brother", an episode of Canadian drama The Guard
- "He's Very Heavy, He's My Brother", an episode of American series That's Life

== See also ==
- He Ain't Heavy, He's My Brother (disambiguation)
