= He's Not Heavy =

He's Not Heavy may refer to:

- He's Not Heavy (film), a 1998 film directed by Bo Svenson
- "He's Not Heavy", an episode of Mysterious Island

== See also ==
- He Ain't Heavy (disambiguation)
- He Ain't Heavy, He's My Brother (disambiguation)
