= Lei Yixin =

Chinese sculptor

Lei Yixin Chinese: 雷宜锌
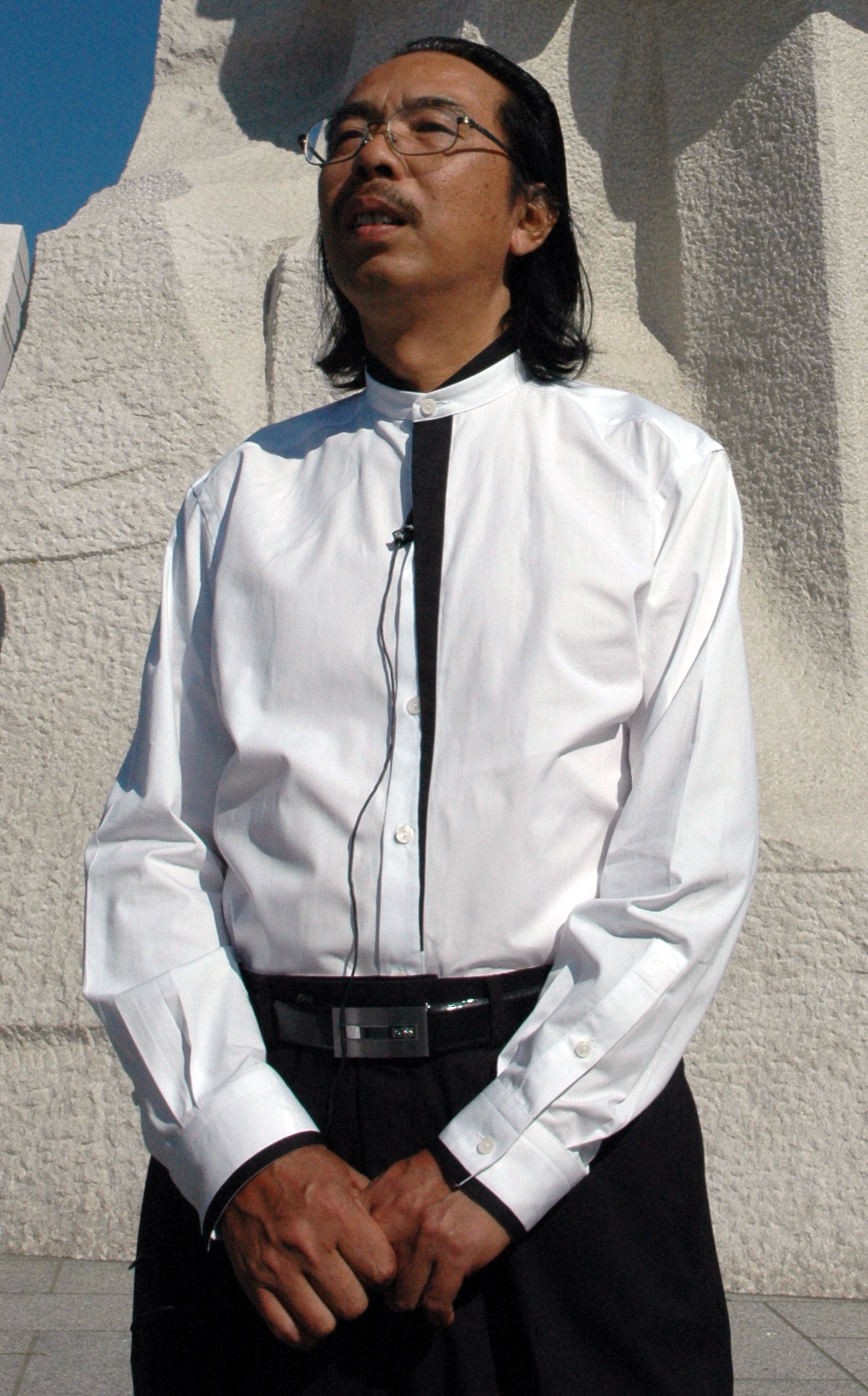
- Lei Yixin standing in front of his sculpture Stone of Hope at the Martin Luther King Jr. Memorial
- Born: 1954 (age 71–72); Changsha, Hunan, China
- Occupation: Sculptor
- Known for: Martin Luther King Jr. Memorial

Lei Yixin (born 1954) is a Chinese sculptor. Lei designed the Stone of Hope, the statue of Martin Luther King Jr. at the King Memorial near the United States National Mall.

== Childhood and education ==
Lei was born to a family of scholars in Changsha, Hunan, China.

Lei was one of millions of "bourgeois educated youth" sent to the countryside (Down to the Countryside Movement) during the Cultural Revolution. As a way to develop a skill other than farming during the seven years he spent toiling in the fields, Lei started drawing. His diary became his scrapbook, with a few lines of comments on his drawings. When Lei applied to college, he submitted the diary as his portfolio.

Lei was among the first class of students after the Cultural Revolution to be able to go to art school in 1978; he graduated in 1982.

== Career ==
Lei first found work in a publishing company as a draughtsman, but was spotted by a local government official, who asked and encouraged him to build monuments.

Lei won top prizes in national competitions three consecutive years, and was recognized as a master sculptor, which came with a lifetime stipend from the Chinese government. He has sculpted some 150 public monuments, including statues of Mao Zedong. Some of his works are in China's National Art Gallery collection. Lei came to the attention of the American public when he was named artist-of-record and commissioned to sculpt the centerpiece for the proposed monument to Dr. Martin Luther King, Jr. The announcement of Lei spurred an international protest spearheaded by Gilbert Young and Lea-Winfrey Young, co-founders of the organization "King Is Ours", a multi-racial and multi-cultural organization formed to protest the decisions made by the King Memorial Project Foundation which included choosing Lei without due process. According to Agence France-Presse, it was only by chance that memorial organizers found Lei when they visited an international granite-carving festival in the American state of Minnesota. Lei was "discovered" under a tree, taking a nap after he was pointed out to the King Memorial Project Foundation committee with the words, "you should talk to that guy over there," pointing to Lei.

The 2.3 metres (7 ft 7 in) tall sculpture at the International Stone Sculpture Conference drew attention to his work, yet Lei has revealed that the sculpture he created at the conference was the first he had ever carved on his own. Ed Jackson, the executive architect at the MLK Foundation, was immediately impressed by Lei's sculpture Contemplation at the "Minnesota Rocks! Symposium" in June 2006, and in 2007 Lei was named head sculptor for the Stone of Hope at the Martin Luther King Jr. Memorial.

In April 2008, the U.S. Commission of Fine Arts rejected Lei's design for the King Memorial Sculpture. In a letter dated 28 April, the commission wrote that Lei's presentation was an inappropriate expression of Dr. King, declaring King too "confrontational" in Lei's sculpture, and asking for a more "sympathetic" King. Some changes were made to Lei's design, and construction began. There were other controversies on the project which did not involve Lei, but were often connected to him, such as over the Chinese sourcing of granite for his sculpture and the choice of Chinese artisans who were employed to carve the stone, both of which were the decision of lead architect Ed Jackson. In addition, mistakes by the architects on the project forced Lei to make last-minute changes, such as replacing a pen in the hand of King with a scroll when a photo the architects had used as a model turned out to be reversed. Most controversially, the "drum major" quote by King was shortened for inclusion on Lei's sculpture; this occurred when the team of architects wanted Lei to reverse the placement of two planned quotes, after he had already been instructed to carve out space for them, and having done as instructed, there was then not enough space for the quote in a new position unless it was shortened. Jackson made the decision to cut the quote down to size. Later criticism by poet Maya Angelou, The Washington Post, and others caused a reassessment of that decision, and the entire quote was removed in August 2013.

The completed work, a 30 feet (9.1 m) tall statue, was unveiled in August 2011 to mark the 48th anniversary of King's "I Have a Dream" speech. Due to Hurricane Irene, the official dedication was postponed until October 2011. Reviews of the finished sculpture were mixed. Some reviewers criticized the King statue on the basis of Lei's earlier work making representations of Mao Zedong, of which they disapproved. Other reviews focused on the way Lei depicted King. The stoic, unsmiling pose of King in Lei's sculpture has been criticized by some since the initial rejection of Lei's design, due to its perceived severe divergence from a popular media image of King as a unifying, hopeful leader and peace campaigner. However, other critics praised Lei's more risky depiction. African Americans in particular noted the avoidance of mythology in the "confrontational" expression of King, suggesting Lei showed King facing the challenges of the present rather than dwelling in nostalgia. Lei said, "you can see the hope, but his serious demeanor also indicated that he's thinking."
