= Colion Noir =

American gun rights activist (born 1983)

- Born: Collins Iyare Idehen Jr. November 27, 1983 (age 42); Houston, Texas, U.S.
- Education: University of Houston (BA); Thurgood Marshall School of Law (JD)
- Occupation: Second Amendment rights activist
- Years active: 2011–present
- Known for: Gun rights activism

YouTube information
- Channel: Colion Noir
- Years active: 2016–present
- Genre: Arms rights
- Subscribers: 3.21 million
- Views: 682 million
- Last updated: December 23, 2025

Collins Iyare Idehen Jr. (born November 27, 1983), better known as Colion Noir, is an American gun rights activist, YouTuber, and lawyer. Colion has criticized gun control measures such gun-free zones and gun bans as being ineffective and tyrannical and has extensively criticized the killing of Philando Castile, a black concealed carry permit holder who was shot by police.

== Early life ==
Collins Iyare Idehen, Jr., more commonly known as Colion Noir, was born in Houston, Texas, to immigrants from Nigeria. His father is an executive chef and his mother is a registered nurse. As an only child, he grew up in an apartment complex in the Alief neighborhood of Houston, Texas before eventually moving to Sugar Land with his mother.

Noir graduated from high school in Houston. He earned a political science degree from the University of Houston and in 2012, a J.D. degree from the Thurgood Marshall School of Law at Texas Southern University. He first became interested in firearms while a law school student. He interned at a small personal injury firm in Houston after law school.

== NRA work and YouTube ==
In 2013, the National Rifle Association of America (NRA) recruited him to appear in NRA News videos. Later that year, he appeared at its convention in Houston. Since then, he has been described in The Guardian as the NRA's "most prominent black commentator" and in Houstonia as its "most visible black supporter." When Noir received blowback for being a black man joining the NRA, he initially expressed frustration that his race was treated as significant, but later reported feeling encouraged by supporters who welcomed the visibility of a nonwhite representative of gun owners.

Idehen created the alias "Colion Noir" in 2011 when he began posting videos about guns to YouTube to avoid harassment towards his family. As of December 2025, he has 3.21 million subscribers.

== Political views ==
Noir voted for Donald Trump in the 2016 presidential election, mainly over Second Amendment concerns. In 2018, he considered himself "right of center."

In 2016, Noir criticized the decision in the case on the killing of Philando Castile, saying the acquittal of Yanez is "just wrong" and that "covert racism is a real thing." At the same time, he disagreed with accusations of the NRA being a racist organization and blamed the mainstream media for promoting "conflict and division over race in America." In response to the 2018 Parkland high school shooting, he disagreed with those advocating for stricter gun regulations, instead advocating for more good guys with guns. Colion has criticized gun-free zones, stating that it's "just a sign in the window saying 'Gun-free zone" and that he does not think, "a mass shooter’s going to see that sign and turn around."

== Personal life ==
Noir has stated that he prefers an AR-15 to a handgun for home defense, arguing that it is more accurate and easier to fire, and asserting that, "the very reasons they want to condemn it are the same reasons I want it."
