= Harry E. Johnson =

American lawyer

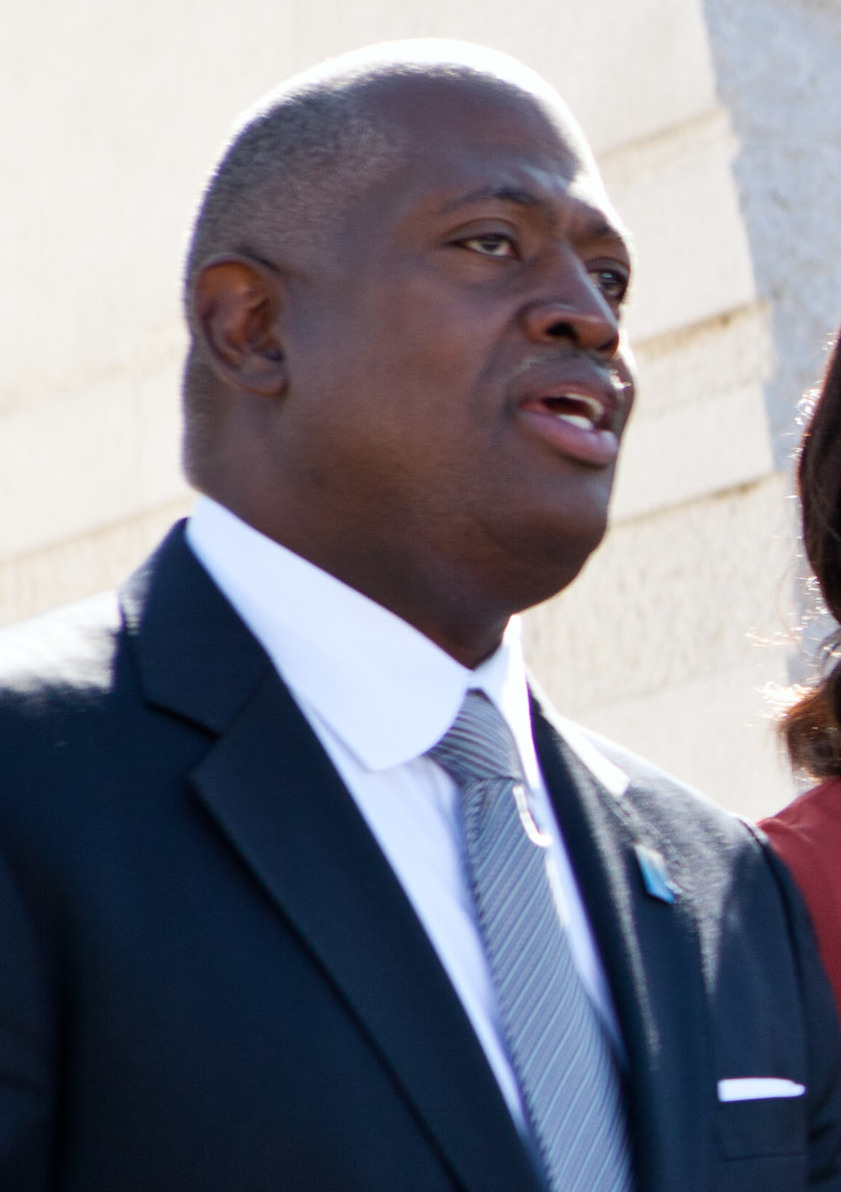
- Johnson in 2011
- Born: Harry Edward Johnson; September 29, 1954 (age 71); St. Louis, Missouri, US
- Education: Xavier University; Saint Louis University; Thurgood Marshall School of Law
- Occupation: Attorney
- Years active: 2001-present
- Known for: President and CEO, Martin Luther King Jr. Memorial

Harry Edward Johnson (born September 29, 1954) is an American lawyer, academic, and businessman. Johnson is a former national president of Alpha Phi Alpha fraternity and was the president and CEO of the Martin Luther King Jr. National Memorial Project Foundation, Inc.

== Early life ==
Johnson was born September 29, 1954, in St. Louis, Missouri. His father was James J. Johnson, a tax collector and police officer. His mother, Sara L. (née Pegues) Johnson, worked for the St. Louis Board of Elections as a secretary. When he was nine years old, his parents divorced.

Johnson was raised Roman Catholic and attended Catholic schools. He attended Christian Brothers College High School of St. Louis.

He received a Bachelor of Arts in political science from Xavier University of Louisiana in 1977. While there, he joined Phi Alpha Delta, serving as its president.

He then attended Saint Louis University with plans on completing a master's degree in public administration. However, he withdrew to pursue a Doctor of Jurisprudence at Thurgood Marshall School of Law, graduating in May 1986. While there, he was a member of the Thurgood Marshall Student Bar Association.

== Career ==
In 1986, Johnson established a private practice in Houston, Texas. Johnson was the city attorney for Kendleton, Texas from 1996 to 1999. He then joined the law firm of Highland Poe, where he is currently the executive vice chairman. He also was an adjunct lecturer at the Thurgood Marshall School of Law from 2000 to 2004. He is a member of the American Bar Association, National Bar Association, and State Bar of Texas, the Texas Trial Lawyers Association, and the Houston Trial Lawyers Association.

Johnson was the founder, president, and CEO of the Washington, D.C. Martin Luther King Memorial Foundation from 2002 to 2013. The foundation's mission, assigned by the President of the United States and the United States Congress, was to create the Martin Luther King Jr. Memorial on the National Mall in Washington, D.C. Under Johnson’s leadership, the foundation raised $127 million for the memorial. He oversaw the memorial through installation and dedication in 2011.

Johnson owned and operated a Domino's franchise in Houston. He is also president of the airport concessionaire, Creative Concourse Concessions, LLC. In August 2024, he became the chairman of the Minority Business Development Agency.

== Honors and awards ==
Johnson has received several recognitions for his community involvement and public service, including:

- Alumnus of the Year, Thurgood Marshall School of Law, 1995
- National Leadership Award, Delta Sigma Theta, 2002
- Ebony Magazine, 100 Most Influential Black Americans, 2001 through 2004, 2004
- Trailblazer Award, NAACP, Missouri City Branch, 2004
- National Service Award, Diplomatic Core, Washington, D.C., 2007
- Trumpet Awards, President’s Award, 2011

== Personal life ==
Johnson and his wife, Karen Gorrell Johnson, have three children. They live in Houston, Texas.

Johnson served as the 31st national president of Alpha Phi Alpha fraternity from 2001 to 2004, stepping down to work on the MLK Memorial. He served on the national board of Big Brothers Big Sisters, the National Urban League, the March of Dimes, and the AARP Foundation. He also served on the board of the Sam Houston Boy Scouts of America.

Preceded by Adrian L. Wallace	General President of Alpha Phi Alpha; 2001-2004	Succeeded by Darryl R. Matthews
