= He Ain't Heavy, He's My Brother (disambiguation) =

"He Ain't Heavy, He's My Brother" is a 1969 song by the band the Hollies.

He Ain't Heavy, He's My Brother may also refer to:

- He Ain't Heavy, He's My Brother (album), a 1969 Hollies album, also known as Hollies Sing Hollies and including the song of the same name
- He Ain't Heavy, He's My Brother (film), a Hong Kong film, also known as He Ain't Heavy, He's My Father or 新難兄難弟
- "He Ain't Heavy, He's My Brother", an episode of Rizzoli & Isles
- "He Ain't Heavy, He's My Brother", an episode of On Our Own (1994 TV series)
- The caption of a logo adopted by Boys Town in 1943

== See also ==
- He Ain't Heavy (disambiguation)
- He's No Heavy, He's My Brother (disambiguation)
- He's Heavy, He's My Brother (disambiguation)
- He Ain't Heavy, He's My Father (disambiguation)
- "He Ain't a Hottie, He's My Brother", an episode of Hannah Montana
- "He Ain't Heavy, He's My Bother", an episode of Heathcliff (1984 TV series)
- "He Ain't Heavy, He's Dee's Brother", an episode of Moesha
- "He Ain't Heavy, He's Willie's Brother", an episode of ALF
- "Lee Ain't Heavy, He's My Brother", an episode of Three's Company
