= He Ain't Heavy =

He Ain't Heavy may refer to:

== Television ==
American television

- "He Ain't Heavy", an episode of She-Ra: Princess of Power
- "He Ain't Heavy", an episode of The New Adventures of Old Christine
- "He Ain't Heavy", a segment of an episode of The Love Boat
- "He Ain't Heavy", an episode of Doc

British television

- "He Ain't Heavy", an episode of Custer's Last Stand-up
- "He Ain't Heavy", an episode of Doctors (2000 TV series)

International television

- "He Ain't Heavy...", an episode of the Canadian series Degrassi Junior High
- "He Ain't Heavy", an episode of the Australian series Head Start (TV series)

== Art ==
- A painting by Cincinnati artist Gilbert Young, widely popular amongst African-Americans with approximately one million reproductions sold

== See also ==
- She Ain't Heavy (disambiguation)
- He's Not Heavy (disambiguation)
- He Ain't Heavy, He's My Brother (disambiguation)
