= She Ain't Heavy =

She Ain't Heavy may refer to:

- "She Ain't Heavy" (Dark Angel), an episode of Dark Angel
- "She Ain't Heavy", an episode of The Fresh Prince of Bel-Air
- "She Ain't Heavy", an episode of Jack & Jill (TV series)
- "She Ain't Heavy", an episode of Packed to the Rafters
- "She Ain't Heavy, She's My Cousin", an episode of Doogie Howser, M.D.
- "She Ain't Heavy, She My Mother", an episode of Living Single
- "She Ain't Heavy, She's My Sister", an episode of Hey Dad..!
- "She Ain't Heavy, She's My Partner", an episode of Whoopi

== See also ==
- He Ain't Heavy (disambiguation)
