= Gilbert Young =

American artist

- Born: 1941 (age 84–85); Cincinnati, Ohio
- Monuments: He Ain't Heavy (Atlanta, GA)
- Citizenship: USA
- Known for: Artist; Muralist; Art conservator
- Website: www.gilbertyoungart.com

The Artist Gilbert Young

Gilbert Young (born 1941) is an American visual artist born and raised in Cincinnati, Ohio specializing in conceptions of the African-American experience. He served twenty-seven years as director and conservator of the University of Cincinnati’s vast, fine art collection beginning in the 1960’s. He re-located to Atlanta in 1995 to serve as artistic director for the Paint Pals International Youth Art Competition in conjunction with the 1996 Olympics.

Young's most recognized work entitled "He Ain't Heavy"

Young is best known for his painting "He Ain't Heavy ", created in 1979, showing a man reaching down for another man's hand, which as of 2004 had sold "nearly one million" copies.

Young has been recognized in numerous editions of “Who’s Who in Black Atlanta,” and was inducted into “Who’s Who in America” in 2012. His art has been used by BellSouth advertising and on T-shirts worn by actors on Bill Cosby's NBC sitcom A Different World.

Leading up to the unveiling of the first monument to an African American on the National Mall US Park Service, Gilbert Young and his wife, L.Winfrey Young, were joined by American stone carver Clint Button in a protest called "King is Ours" against the proposed national monument to Dr. Martin Luther King, Jr.. The Youngs and Button did not protest creation of the monument. The protest was aimed at use of the chosen design team, the artist and the proposed materials.

Complaints included the selection of Chinese sculptor Lei Yixin to create the National Mall's Martin Luther King, Jr. Memorial. Lei Yixin is renowned in his country for his sculptures of Chairman Mao an antithess to the doctrines of King. In a noteworthy speech, the Chinese government referred to Dr. King as a "reactionary running dog".

One of the Young/Button objections was that the sculptor chosen was not African-American.. Others included the fact that the original artist of record was the renowned African American sculptor Ed Dwight who had been unceremoniously dismissed after writing an extensive critique of the maquette presented by Lei Yixin. Dwight likened the proposed sculpture to those displayed in China. The use of granite from China, mined by unpaid labor, was an issue protested by US granite companies that had offered the granite to the project free of charge. One of the most offensive realities of the project was the idea of a monument to Dr. Martin Luther King Jr. being shipped from overseas in crates that read "Made in China."

Young's extensive career has included receipt of numerous awards for artistic achievement. These include: The Heritage Award for Outstanding Visual Arts (2001)from the Schomburg Center for Research in Black Culture in New York; the City of Atlanta Pallet Award for Lifetime Achievement (2004); a Resolution from the Georgia House of Representatives naming him State of Georgia Artist of the Year (2011); the Phoenix Award from the city of Atlanta Mayor’s office for outstanding contributions to the arts (2013); the Georgia Legislative Black Caucus Citizen’s Award for outstanding artistic achievement (2015); a Lifetime Achievement Award from the Barack H. Obama Foundation (2019); a Resolution (351) from the Georgia House of Representatives (2021); the Tower of Strength Award from Morris Brown College (2022); the Dr. Ruth Hodges Award for Distinguished Achievement in Art (2022); the Visionary Black Art & Legacy Award (2026); a Proclamation from Fulton County Commissioners proclaiming July 15, 2026 “Gilbert Young Appreciation Day;” and a lifetime achievement award during the 15th anniversary of the Atlanta Black Theater Festival in September, 2026.

Gilbert has received keys to numerous cities including Cambridge, Massachusetts after being invited to speak at Harvard Law School for an event titled "Am I My Brother's Keeper?" where Young's work "He Ain't Heavy" served as a focal point for the event.

President Barak Obama signing the portrait painted by Gilbert Young entitled "History + Hope = Change"

Young is the only artist to paint a portrait of an American President that is signed by the subject. The portrait of Barack Obama is titled “History + Hope = Change.” It is the only painted portrait of a US president that is signed by the subject and has thus become the only painted signed portrait of the first African American president, and first two-term African American president.

In 2014 Young was commissioned by the Congressional Club of Washington, DC to create a portrait of Michelle Obama to commemorate Mrs. Obama's "Let's Move" national health initiative. The original work was presented to Mrs. Obama during the annual First Lady’s Luncheon.

In 2019, Gilbert Young completed the longest mural in Atlanta, measuring 700 feet.
