= List of ALF episodes =

The following is a list of episodes of the American sitcom ALF. Most episode titles derive from those of American and British popular songs.

== Series overview ==
Season	Episodes	Originally released		Rank	Rating
Season	Episodes	First released	Last released	Rank	Rating
1	25	September 22, 1986	May 11, 1987	#28	16.5 (Note: Tied with Hunter)
2	24	September 21, 1987	May 9, 1988	#10	18.8 (Note: Tied with The Wonder Years)
3	24	October 3, 1988	May 8, 1989	#13	17.7 (Note: Tied with Matlock)
4	24	September 18, 1989	March 24, 1990	#39	13.7 (Note: Tied with Family Matters and Jake and the Fatman)

== Episodes ==
=== Season 1 (1986–87) ===
No. overall	No. in season	Title	Directed by	Written by	Original release date	Prod. code	Rating/share (households)
1	1	"A.L.F."	Tom Patchett	Tom Patchett	September 22, 1986	1001	15.6/24
2	2	"Strangers in the Night"	Peter Bonerz	Paul Fusco & Thad Mumford	September 29, 1986	1004	13.8/21
3	3	"Looking for Lucky"	Peter Bonerz	Bob Bendetson & Howard Bendetson	October 6, 1986	1006	15.1/23
4	4	"Pennsylvania 6-5000"	Peter Bonerz	Donald Todd	October 13, 1986	1003	14.4/21
5	5	"Keepin' the Faith"	Peter Bonerz	Laurie Gelman	October 20, 1986	1008	15.6/23
6	6	"For Your Eyes Only"	Peter Bonerz	Mitzi McCall & Adrienne Armstrong	November 3, 1986	1005	15.5/23
7	7	"Help Me, Rhonda"	Peter Bonerz and Rick Gough	Tom Patchett & Lloyd Garver	November 10, 1986	1010	15.7/23
8	8	"Don't It Make Your Brown Eyes Blue?"	Tom Patchett	Jerry Stahl	November 17, 1986	1011	21.5/31
9	9	"Jump"	Peter Bonerz	Gary Markowitz	November 24, 1986	1009	13.8/20
10	10	"Baby, You Can Drive My Car"	Nancy Heydorn	Thad Mumford & Laurie Gelman	December 1, 1986	1013	15.1/22
11	11	"On the Road Again"	Peter Bonerz	Bob Bendetson & Howard Bendetson	December 8, 1986	1002	15.9/24
12	12	"Oh, Tannerbaum"	Rick Gough	Donald Todd	December 22, 1986	1012	15.4/25
13	13	"Mother and Child Reunion"	Tom Patchett	Bob Bendetson & Howard Bendetson	January 12, 1987	1014	18.1/26
14	14	"A Little Bit of Soap"	Tom Patchett	Laurie Gelman	January 19, 1987	1015	18.4/25
15	15	"I've Got a New Attitude"	Nancy Heydorn	Thad Mumford	February 2, 1987	1017	15.1/23
16	16	"Try to Remember"	Tom Patchett	Laurie Gelman, Bob Bendetson, Howard Bendetson & Donald Todd	February 9, 1987	1023	17.3/25
17	17	"Border Song"	Tom Patchett	Donald Todd	February 16, 1987	1016	18.2/25
18	18	"Wild Thing"	Nancy Heydorn	David Silverman & Stephen Sustarsic	March 2, 1987	1018	18.3/27
19	19	"Going Out of My Head Over You"	Nancy Heydorn	Bob Bendetson & Howard Bendetson	March 16, 1987	1019	17.0/25
20	20	"Lookin' Through the Windows"	Nancy Heydorn	Bob Bendetson	March 23, 1987	1021	17.2/26
21	21	"It's Not Easy Bein' Green"	Peter Bonerz	Wendy Graf & Lisa Stotsky	March 30, 1987	1007	18.5/26
22	22	"The Gambler"	Gary Shimokawa	Thad Mumford & Laurie Gelman	April 6, 1987	1022	17.0/26
23	23	"Weird Science"	Paul Fusco	Paul Fusco	April 13, 1987	1020	17.4/28
24	24	"La Cucaracha"	Peter Baldwin	Jerry Stahl	May 4, 1987	1025	16.4/26
25	25	"Come Fly With Me"	Peter Baldwin	Nelson Costello	May 11, 1987	1024	14.1/25

=== Season 2 (1987–88) ===
No. overall	No. in season	Title	Directed by	Written by	Original release date	Prod. code	Rating/share (households)
26	1	"Working My Way Back to You"	Nick Havinga	Steve Pepoon	September 21, 1987	2003	17.9/29
27	2	"Somewhere Over the Rerun" "The Ballad of Gilligan's Island"	Nick Havinga	Scott Spencer Gorden	September 28, 1987	2004	20.3/32
28	3	"Take a Look at Me Now"	Gary Shimokawa	Steve Pepoon	October 5, 1987	2006	18.5/30
29	4	"Wedding Bell Blues"	Burt Brinckerhoff	Lisa A. Bannick	October 12, 1987	2010	19.9/31
30	5	"Prime Time"	Burt Brinckerhoff	Lisa A. Bannick	October 19, 1987	2009	17.7/27
31	6	"Some Enchanted Evening"	Gary Shimokawa	Seth Weisbord	October 26, 1987	2005	18.5/28
32	7	"Oh, Pretty Woman"	Burt Brinckerhoff	Alicia Marie Schudt	November 2, 1987	2001	18.2/27
33	8	"Something's Wrong With Me"	Burt Brinckerhoff	Steve Pepoon	November 9, 1987	2011	18.9/28
34	9	"Night Train"	Burt Brinckerhoff	Bob Bendetson	November 16, 1987	2013	19.7/30
35	10	"Isn't It Romantic?"	Gary Shimokawa	Seth Weisbord	November 23, 1987	2008	18.9/29
36	11	"Hail to the Chief"	Burt Brinckerhoff	Lisa A. Bannick	December 7, 1987	2014	17.2/26
37	12	"ALF's Special Christmas"	Burt Brinckerhoff	Steven Hollander	December 14, 1987	2040	21.1/31
38	13	"The Boy Next Door"	Burt Brinckerhoff	Al Jean & Michael Reiss	January 4, 1988	2015	20.4/29
39	14	"Can I Get a Witness?"	Gary Shimokawa	Nelson Costello	January 11, 1988	2007	19.8/29
40	15	"We're So Sorry, Uncle Albert"	Nick Havinga	Paul Fusco	January 25, 1988	2016	17.3/25
41	16–17	"Someone to Watch Over Me"	Gary Shimokawa	Lisa Stotsky & Wendy Graf	February 8, 1988	2019	19.2/28
41	16–17	"Someone to Watch Over Me"	Gary Shimokawa	Lisa Stotsky & Wendy Graf	February 15, 1988	2020	18.6/27
42	18	"We Gotta Get Out of This Place"	Gary Shimokawa	Marjorie Gross	February 22, 1988	2018	18.2/27
43	19	"You Ain't Nothin' But a Hound Dog"	Gary Shimokawa	Scott Spencer Gorden	February 29, 1988	2002	20.5/32
44	20	"Hit Me with Your Best Shot"	Gary Shimokawa	Kevin Abbott	March 7, 1988	2021	18.5/29
45	21	"Movin' Out"	Tony Csiki and Nick Havinga	Alicia Marie Schudt	March 14, 1988	2022	19.1/29
46	22	"I'm Your Puppet"	Burt Brinckerhoff	Al Jean & Michael Reiss	March 21, 1988	2012	19.3/30
47	23	"Tequila"	Nick Havinga	Story by : Sandy Gillis; Teleplay by : Art Everett	March 28, 1988	2023	19.4/30
48	24	"We Are Family"	Nick Havinga	Steve Pepoon	May 2, 1988	2024	15.5/27
49	25	"Varsity Drag"	Gary Shimokawa	Lisa A. Bannick	May 9, 1988	2017	16.3/27

=== Season 3 (1988–89) ===
No. overall	No. in season	Title	Directed by	Written by	Original release date	Prod. code	U.S. viewers (millions)	Rating/share (households)
50	1	"Stop in the Name of Love"	Nick Havinga	Skip Frank & Gwyn Gurian	October 3, 1988	3001	29.6	18.3/29
51	2	"Stairway to Heaven"	Burt Brinckerhoff	Philip Whitehill	October 10, 1988	3005	28.7	17.6/27
52	3	"Breaking Up is Hard to Do"	Nick Havinga	Steve Pepoon	October 17, 1988	3002	30.2	18.6/30
53	4	"Tonight, Tonight"	Burt Brinckerhoff	Lisa A. Bannick, Steve Pepoon, Al Jean & Michael Reiss	October 24, 1988	3006	30.2	18.5/28
54	5	"Promises, Promises"	Burt Brinckerhoff	Beverly Archer	October 31, 1988	3004	24.2	15.1/24
55	6	"Turkey in the Straw"	Nick Havinga	Tom Patchett & Steve Hollander	November 14, 1988	3008	29.7	18.0/27 18.0/27
55	6	"Turkey in the Straw"	Nick Havinga	Tom Patchett & Steve Hollander	November 15, 1988	3008	30.0	18.0/27 18.0/27
56	7	"Changes"	Nick Havinga	Lisa A. Bannick	November 21, 1988	3007	29.9	18.0/28
57	8	"My Back Pages"	Burt Brinckerhoff	Ron Burla	November 28, 1988	3012	24.2	15.6/23
58	9	"Alone Again, Naturally"	Burt Brinckerhoff	Paul Fusco	December 5, 1988	3013	24.0	15.5/23
59	10	"Do You Believe in Magic?"	Tony Csiki	Scott Spencer Gorden	December 12, 1988	3009	30.9	18.6/28
60	11	"Hide Away"	Burt Brinckerhoff	Steve Pepoon	January 9, 1989	3014	28.7	17.6/26
61	12	"Fight Back"	Nick Havinga	Seth Weisbord	January 16, 1989	3016	30.8	18.1/27
62	13	"Suspicious Minds"	Nick Havinga	Al Jean & Michael Reiss	January 23, 1989	3010	34.0	20.4/30
63	14	"Baby Love"	Nick Havinga	Lisa A. Bannick	February 6, 1989	3011	38.9	22.8/32
64	15	"Running Scared"	Gary Shimokawa	Steve Pepoon	February 13, 1989	3017	30.0	17.8/27
65	16	"Standing in the Shadows of Love"	Nick Havinga	David Cohen & Roger S.H. Schulman	February 20, 1989	3015	30.7	18.4/27
66	17	"Superstition"	Gary Shimokawa	Steve Pepoon	February 27, 1989	3020	29.1	17.6/26
67	18	"Torn Between Two Lovers"	Nick Havinga	Beverly Archer	March 6, 1989	3021	34.2	20.7/30
68	19	"Funeral for a Friend"	Paul Fusco	Scott Spencer Gorden	March 20, 1989	3023	30.0	18.0/28
69	20	"Don't Be Afraid of the Dark"	Nick Havinga	Alicia Marie Schudt	March 27, 1989	3022	28.0	17.1/27
70	21	"Have You Seen Your Mother, Baby, Standing in the Shadow?"	Howard Storm	Paul Fusco & Lisa A. Bannick	April 10, 1989	3026	28.1	17.6/28
71	22	"Like an Old Time Movie"	Nick Havinga	Nelson Costello	April 17, 1989	3003	22.7	14.7/26
72	23	"Shake, Rattle and Roll"	Nick Havinga	Ron Burla	May 1, 1989	3018	24.0	14.5/24
73	24	"Having My Baby"	Nick Havinga	Lisa A. Bannick	May 8, 1989	3019	25.1	15.7/27

=== Season 4 (1989–90) ===
No. overall	No. in season	Title	Directed by	Written by	Original release date	Prod. code	U.S. viewers (millions)
74	1	"Baby, Come Back"	Paul Miller	David Silverman & Stephen Sustarsic	September 18, 1989	4002	22.5
75	2	"Lies"	Paul Miller	Jordan Tabat & Wesley Stern	September 25, 1989	4003	22.4
76	3	"Wanted: Dead or Alive"	Nick Havinga	Victor Fresco	October 2, 1989	4004	22.3
77	4	"We're in the Money"	Paul Miller	Jeanne Baruch & Jeanne Romano	October 9, 1989	4001	22.7
78	5	"Mind Games"	Nick Havinga	Jerry Stahl	October 16, 1989	3024	23.4
79	6	"Hooked on a Feeling"	Nick Havinga	Victor Fresco	October 23, 1989	4005	22.6
80	7	"He Ain't Heavy, He's Willie's Brother"	Paul Fusco	Paul Fusco & Lisa A. Bannick	October 30, 1989	4006	21.4
81	8	"The First Time Ever I Saw Your Face"	Paul Fusco	Paul Fusco & Lisa A. Bannick	November 6, 1989	4007	23.9
82	9	"Live and Let Die"	Tony Csiki	Steve Pepoon	November 13, 1989	4008	24.4
83	10	"Break Up to Make Up"	Tony Csiki	Anne Meara	November 20, 1989	4009	22.9
84	11	"Happy Together"	Paul Fusco	David Silverman & Stephen Sustarsic	November 27, 1989	4010	22.6
85	12	"Fever"	Paul Miller	Bruce David	December 4, 1989	3025	22.7
86	13	"It's My Party"	Nick Havinga	Steve Pepoon	December 11, 1989	4012	23.2
87	14	"Make 'Em Laugh"	Nick Havinga	Howard Bendetson	January 8, 1990	4011	23.5
88	15	"Love on the Rocks"	Nick Havinga	Cecile Alch & Patricia Niedzialek	January 15, 1990	4014	21.7
89	16	"True Colors"	Paul Miller	David Silverman & Stephen Sustarsic	January 22, 1990	4015	18.8
90	17	"Gimme That Old Time Religion"	Paul Fusco	Leslie Ann Podkin	January 29, 1990	4016	20.9
91	18	"Future's So Bright, I Gotta Wear Shades"	Nick Havinga	Victor Fresco	February 5, 1990	4013	20.5
92	19	"When I'm 64"	Paul Miller	David Silverman & Stephen Sustarsic	February 12, 1990	4018	29.3
93	20	"Mr. Sandman"	Paul Miller	Steve Pepoon	February 19, 1990	4019	21.0
94	21	"Stayin' Alive"	Nick Havinga	Victor Fresco	February 26, 1990	4020	21.9
95	22	"Hungry Like the Wolf"	Nick Havinga	Paul Fusco	March 3, 1990	4021	17.4
96	23	"I Gotta Be Me"	Paul Miller	Beverly Archer	March 10, 1990	4017	17.5
97	24	"Consider Me Gone"	Nick Havinga	Story by : Ian Praiser; Teleplay by : Steve Pepoon, David Silverman, Stephen Sustarsic & Victor Fresco	March 24, 1990	4022	21.7

== See also ==
- Project ALF, a 1996 TV movie that functions as a sequel to the final episode (although with many different actors thus getting bad reviews)
